

104001–104100 

|-bgcolor=#fefefe
| 104001 ||  || — || February 29, 2000 || Socorro || LINEAR || FLO || align=right | 1.7 km || 
|-id=002 bgcolor=#fefefe
| 104002 ||  || — || February 29, 2000 || Socorro || LINEAR || FLO || align=right | 1.5 km || 
|-id=003 bgcolor=#fefefe
| 104003 ||  || — || February 29, 2000 || Socorro || LINEAR || — || align=right | 2.1 km || 
|-id=004 bgcolor=#E9E9E9
| 104004 ||  || — || February 29, 2000 || Socorro || LINEAR || — || align=right | 2.5 km || 
|-id=005 bgcolor=#d6d6d6
| 104005 ||  || — || February 29, 2000 || Socorro || LINEAR || — || align=right | 3.2 km || 
|-id=006 bgcolor=#fefefe
| 104006 ||  || — || February 29, 2000 || Socorro || LINEAR || — || align=right | 1.9 km || 
|-id=007 bgcolor=#E9E9E9
| 104007 ||  || — || February 29, 2000 || Socorro || LINEAR || WIT || align=right | 2.1 km || 
|-id=008 bgcolor=#fefefe
| 104008 ||  || — || February 29, 2000 || Socorro || LINEAR || — || align=right | 1.5 km || 
|-id=009 bgcolor=#fefefe
| 104009 ||  || — || February 29, 2000 || Socorro || LINEAR || FLO || align=right | 1.9 km || 
|-id=010 bgcolor=#E9E9E9
| 104010 ||  || — || February 29, 2000 || Socorro || LINEAR || HEN || align=right | 2.7 km || 
|-id=011 bgcolor=#E9E9E9
| 104011 ||  || — || February 29, 2000 || Socorro || LINEAR || — || align=right | 3.3 km || 
|-id=012 bgcolor=#E9E9E9
| 104012 ||  || — || February 29, 2000 || Socorro || LINEAR || — || align=right | 4.0 km || 
|-id=013 bgcolor=#E9E9E9
| 104013 ||  || — || February 29, 2000 || Socorro || LINEAR || — || align=right | 4.2 km || 
|-id=014 bgcolor=#E9E9E9
| 104014 ||  || — || February 28, 2000 || Socorro || LINEAR || — || align=right | 5.0 km || 
|-id=015 bgcolor=#d6d6d6
| 104015 ||  || — || February 28, 2000 || Socorro || LINEAR || — || align=right | 3.7 km || 
|-id=016 bgcolor=#E9E9E9
| 104016 ||  || — || February 29, 2000 || Socorro || LINEAR || — || align=right | 2.8 km || 
|-id=017 bgcolor=#d6d6d6
| 104017 ||  || — || February 29, 2000 || Socorro || LINEAR || — || align=right | 3.2 km || 
|-id=018 bgcolor=#fefefe
| 104018 ||  || — || February 29, 2000 || Socorro || LINEAR || MAS || align=right | 1.0 km || 
|-id=019 bgcolor=#E9E9E9
| 104019 ||  || — || February 29, 2000 || Socorro || LINEAR || — || align=right | 2.7 km || 
|-id=020 bgcolor=#E9E9E9
| 104020 Heilbronn ||  ||  || February 26, 2000 || Uccle || T. Pauwels || HNA || align=right | 4.2 km || 
|-id=021 bgcolor=#E9E9E9
| 104021 ||  || — || February 25, 2000 || Socorro || LINEAR || GAL || align=right | 3.1 km || 
|-id=022 bgcolor=#fefefe
| 104022 ||  || — || February 29, 2000 || Socorro || LINEAR || — || align=right | 1.5 km || 
|-id=023 bgcolor=#d6d6d6
| 104023 ||  || — || February 29, 2000 || Socorro || LINEAR || — || align=right | 5.1 km || 
|-id=024 bgcolor=#E9E9E9
| 104024 ||  || — || February 29, 2000 || Socorro || LINEAR || — || align=right | 5.6 km || 
|-id=025 bgcolor=#E9E9E9
| 104025 ||  || — || February 29, 2000 || Socorro || LINEAR || — || align=right | 2.0 km || 
|-id=026 bgcolor=#fefefe
| 104026 ||  || — || February 25, 2000 || Kitt Peak || Spacewatch || KLI || align=right | 4.1 km || 
|-id=027 bgcolor=#fefefe
| 104027 ||  || — || February 25, 2000 || Kitt Peak || Spacewatch || NYS || align=right | 1.2 km || 
|-id=028 bgcolor=#d6d6d6
| 104028 ||  || — || February 27, 2000 || Kitt Peak || Spacewatch || — || align=right | 5.4 km || 
|-id=029 bgcolor=#E9E9E9
| 104029 ||  || — || February 27, 2000 || Kitt Peak || Spacewatch || AGN || align=right | 2.8 km || 
|-id=030 bgcolor=#E9E9E9
| 104030 ||  || — || February 25, 2000 || Catalina || CSS || — || align=right | 3.0 km || 
|-id=031 bgcolor=#E9E9E9
| 104031 || 2000 EA || — || March 1, 2000 || Oaxaca || J. M. Roe || — || align=right | 6.2 km || 
|-id=032 bgcolor=#fefefe
| 104032 ||  || — || March 3, 2000 || Socorro || LINEAR || NYS || align=right | 2.9 km || 
|-id=033 bgcolor=#fefefe
| 104033 ||  || — || March 3, 2000 || Socorro || LINEAR || — || align=right | 2.3 km || 
|-id=034 bgcolor=#d6d6d6
| 104034 ||  || — || March 3, 2000 || Socorro || LINEAR || — || align=right | 6.5 km || 
|-id=035 bgcolor=#d6d6d6
| 104035 ||  || — || March 3, 2000 || Socorro || LINEAR || KOR || align=right | 2.8 km || 
|-id=036 bgcolor=#E9E9E9
| 104036 ||  || — || March 2, 2000 || Kitt Peak || Spacewatch || — || align=right | 4.0 km || 
|-id=037 bgcolor=#d6d6d6
| 104037 ||  || — || March 2, 2000 || Kitt Peak || Spacewatch || — || align=right | 2.9 km || 
|-id=038 bgcolor=#fefefe
| 104038 ||  || — || March 2, 2000 || Kitt Peak || Spacewatch || FLO || align=right | 1.2 km || 
|-id=039 bgcolor=#E9E9E9
| 104039 ||  || — || March 2, 2000 || Kitt Peak || Spacewatch || — || align=right | 4.6 km || 
|-id=040 bgcolor=#d6d6d6
| 104040 ||  || — || March 2, 2000 || Kitt Peak || Spacewatch || TEL || align=right | 2.4 km || 
|-id=041 bgcolor=#E9E9E9
| 104041 ||  || — || March 3, 2000 || Socorro || LINEAR || — || align=right | 3.2 km || 
|-id=042 bgcolor=#fefefe
| 104042 ||  || — || March 3, 2000 || Socorro || LINEAR || — || align=right | 1.4 km || 
|-id=043 bgcolor=#E9E9E9
| 104043 ||  || — || March 4, 2000 || Socorro || LINEAR || — || align=right | 2.0 km || 
|-id=044 bgcolor=#fefefe
| 104044 ||  || — || March 4, 2000 || Socorro || LINEAR || — || align=right | 2.1 km || 
|-id=045 bgcolor=#E9E9E9
| 104045 ||  || — || March 4, 2000 || Socorro || LINEAR || — || align=right | 4.3 km || 
|-id=046 bgcolor=#d6d6d6
| 104046 ||  || — || March 4, 2000 || Socorro || LINEAR || URS || align=right | 6.6 km || 
|-id=047 bgcolor=#E9E9E9
| 104047 ||  || — || March 4, 2000 || Socorro || LINEAR || — || align=right | 2.6 km || 
|-id=048 bgcolor=#fefefe
| 104048 ||  || — || March 5, 2000 || Socorro || LINEAR || — || align=right | 2.2 km || 
|-id=049 bgcolor=#d6d6d6
| 104049 ||  || — || March 5, 2000 || Socorro || LINEAR || — || align=right | 5.5 km || 
|-id=050 bgcolor=#fefefe
| 104050 ||  || — || March 5, 2000 || Socorro || LINEAR || — || align=right | 1.7 km || 
|-id=051 bgcolor=#d6d6d6
| 104051 ||  || — || March 3, 2000 || Socorro || LINEAR || — || align=right | 3.5 km || 
|-id=052 bgcolor=#E9E9E9
| 104052 Zachery ||  ||  || March 6, 2000 || Lake Tekapo || N. Brady || JUN || align=right | 1.7 km || 
|-id=053 bgcolor=#E9E9E9
| 104053 ||  || — || March 3, 2000 || Kitt Peak || Spacewatch || — || align=right | 5.2 km || 
|-id=054 bgcolor=#E9E9E9
| 104054 ||  || — || March 3, 2000 || Socorro || LINEAR || — || align=right | 3.5 km || 
|-id=055 bgcolor=#E9E9E9
| 104055 ||  || — || March 4, 2000 || Socorro || LINEAR || — || align=right | 2.7 km || 
|-id=056 bgcolor=#fefefe
| 104056 ||  || — || March 4, 2000 || Socorro || LINEAR || FLO || align=right | 1.3 km || 
|-id=057 bgcolor=#E9E9E9
| 104057 ||  || — || March 4, 2000 || Socorro || LINEAR || EUN || align=right | 2.9 km || 
|-id=058 bgcolor=#fefefe
| 104058 ||  || — || March 4, 2000 || Socorro || LINEAR || V || align=right | 1.5 km || 
|-id=059 bgcolor=#E9E9E9
| 104059 ||  || — || March 4, 2000 || Socorro || LINEAR || EUN || align=right | 2.3 km || 
|-id=060 bgcolor=#E9E9E9
| 104060 ||  || — || March 5, 2000 || Socorro || LINEAR || — || align=right | 4.2 km || 
|-id=061 bgcolor=#d6d6d6
| 104061 ||  || — || March 5, 2000 || Socorro || LINEAR || — || align=right | 5.0 km || 
|-id=062 bgcolor=#d6d6d6
| 104062 ||  || — || March 5, 2000 || Socorro || LINEAR || — || align=right | 5.3 km || 
|-id=063 bgcolor=#fefefe
| 104063 ||  || — || March 5, 2000 || Socorro || LINEAR || — || align=right | 1.7 km || 
|-id=064 bgcolor=#fefefe
| 104064 ||  || — || March 5, 2000 || Socorro || LINEAR || V || align=right | 1.1 km || 
|-id=065 bgcolor=#d6d6d6
| 104065 ||  || — || March 5, 2000 || Socorro || LINEAR || HYG || align=right | 4.8 km || 
|-id=066 bgcolor=#E9E9E9
| 104066 ||  || — || March 3, 2000 || Catalina || CSS || — || align=right | 5.7 km || 
|-id=067 bgcolor=#E9E9E9
| 104067 ||  || — || March 3, 2000 || Catalina || CSS || PAE || align=right | 7.5 km || 
|-id=068 bgcolor=#d6d6d6
| 104068 ||  || — || March 3, 2000 || Kitt Peak || Spacewatch || KOR || align=right | 2.7 km || 
|-id=069 bgcolor=#E9E9E9
| 104069 ||  || — || March 3, 2000 || Kitt Peak || Spacewatch || — || align=right | 1.6 km || 
|-id=070 bgcolor=#E9E9E9
| 104070 ||  || — || March 8, 2000 || Kitt Peak || Spacewatch || HEN || align=right | 1.9 km || 
|-id=071 bgcolor=#fefefe
| 104071 ||  || — || March 8, 2000 || Kitt Peak || Spacewatch || NYS || align=right | 3.2 km || 
|-id=072 bgcolor=#d6d6d6
| 104072 ||  || — || March 8, 2000 || Kitt Peak || Spacewatch || KOR || align=right | 2.4 km || 
|-id=073 bgcolor=#d6d6d6
| 104073 ||  || — || March 8, 2000 || Kitt Peak || Spacewatch || — || align=right | 3.5 km || 
|-id=074 bgcolor=#fefefe
| 104074 ||  || — || March 8, 2000 || Kitt Peak || Spacewatch || — || align=right | 1.8 km || 
|-id=075 bgcolor=#fefefe
| 104075 ||  || — || March 3, 2000 || Socorro || LINEAR || — || align=right | 1.4 km || 
|-id=076 bgcolor=#fefefe
| 104076 ||  || — || March 4, 2000 || Socorro || LINEAR || — || align=right | 2.3 km || 
|-id=077 bgcolor=#E9E9E9
| 104077 ||  || — || March 4, 2000 || Socorro || LINEAR || — || align=right | 2.9 km || 
|-id=078 bgcolor=#d6d6d6
| 104078 ||  || — || March 5, 2000 || Socorro || LINEAR || — || align=right | 6.4 km || 
|-id=079 bgcolor=#E9E9E9
| 104079 ||  || — || March 5, 2000 || Socorro || LINEAR || — || align=right | 4.5 km || 
|-id=080 bgcolor=#fefefe
| 104080 ||  || — || March 5, 2000 || Socorro || LINEAR || FLO || align=right | 1.9 km || 
|-id=081 bgcolor=#fefefe
| 104081 ||  || — || March 5, 2000 || Socorro || LINEAR || V || align=right | 1.2 km || 
|-id=082 bgcolor=#d6d6d6
| 104082 ||  || — || March 5, 2000 || Socorro || LINEAR || — || align=right | 2.7 km || 
|-id=083 bgcolor=#d6d6d6
| 104083 ||  || — || March 5, 2000 || Socorro || LINEAR || EOS || align=right | 5.2 km || 
|-id=084 bgcolor=#fefefe
| 104084 ||  || — || March 5, 2000 || Socorro || LINEAR || — || align=right | 1.9 km || 
|-id=085 bgcolor=#E9E9E9
| 104085 ||  || — || March 5, 2000 || Socorro || LINEAR || — || align=right | 4.7 km || 
|-id=086 bgcolor=#d6d6d6
| 104086 ||  || — || March 5, 2000 || Socorro || LINEAR || EOS || align=right | 4.0 km || 
|-id=087 bgcolor=#fefefe
| 104087 ||  || — || March 5, 2000 || Socorro || LINEAR || Vfast? || align=right | 1.6 km || 
|-id=088 bgcolor=#E9E9E9
| 104088 ||  || — || March 5, 2000 || Socorro || LINEAR || — || align=right | 3.7 km || 
|-id=089 bgcolor=#fefefe
| 104089 ||  || — || March 5, 2000 || Socorro || LINEAR || — || align=right | 1.5 km || 
|-id=090 bgcolor=#fefefe
| 104090 ||  || — || March 5, 2000 || Socorro || LINEAR || FLO || align=right | 3.6 km || 
|-id=091 bgcolor=#E9E9E9
| 104091 ||  || — || March 5, 2000 || Socorro || LINEAR || — || align=right | 3.1 km || 
|-id=092 bgcolor=#E9E9E9
| 104092 ||  || — || March 5, 2000 || Socorro || LINEAR || — || align=right | 4.2 km || 
|-id=093 bgcolor=#E9E9E9
| 104093 ||  || — || March 5, 2000 || Socorro || LINEAR || — || align=right | 1.8 km || 
|-id=094 bgcolor=#fefefe
| 104094 ||  || — || March 6, 2000 || Socorro || LINEAR || — || align=right | 3.3 km || 
|-id=095 bgcolor=#E9E9E9
| 104095 ||  || — || March 6, 2000 || Socorro || LINEAR || — || align=right | 3.3 km || 
|-id=096 bgcolor=#E9E9E9
| 104096 ||  || — || March 8, 2000 || Socorro || LINEAR || — || align=right | 2.3 km || 
|-id=097 bgcolor=#d6d6d6
| 104097 ||  || — || March 5, 2000 || Socorro || LINEAR || — || align=right | 5.1 km || 
|-id=098 bgcolor=#d6d6d6
| 104098 ||  || — || March 8, 2000 || Socorro || LINEAR || KOR || align=right | 3.6 km || 
|-id=099 bgcolor=#fefefe
| 104099 ||  || — || March 8, 2000 || Socorro || LINEAR || V || align=right | 2.0 km || 
|-id=100 bgcolor=#E9E9E9
| 104100 ||  || — || March 8, 2000 || Socorro || LINEAR || — || align=right | 1.6 km || 
|}

104101–104200 

|-bgcolor=#d6d6d6
| 104101 ||  || — || March 8, 2000 || Socorro || LINEAR || — || align=right | 7.1 km || 
|-id=102 bgcolor=#d6d6d6
| 104102 ||  || — || March 8, 2000 || Socorro || LINEAR || 3:2 || align=right | 9.9 km || 
|-id=103 bgcolor=#d6d6d6
| 104103 ||  || — || March 8, 2000 || Socorro || LINEAR || — || align=right | 4.5 km || 
|-id=104 bgcolor=#fefefe
| 104104 ||  || — || March 8, 2000 || Socorro || LINEAR || — || align=right | 1.6 km || 
|-id=105 bgcolor=#E9E9E9
| 104105 ||  || — || March 9, 2000 || Socorro || LINEAR || — || align=right | 2.8 km || 
|-id=106 bgcolor=#E9E9E9
| 104106 ||  || — || March 9, 2000 || Socorro || LINEAR || — || align=right | 2.6 km || 
|-id=107 bgcolor=#fefefe
| 104107 ||  || — || March 9, 2000 || Socorro || LINEAR || — || align=right | 1.8 km || 
|-id=108 bgcolor=#d6d6d6
| 104108 ||  || — || March 9, 2000 || Socorro || LINEAR || — || align=right | 3.1 km || 
|-id=109 bgcolor=#fefefe
| 104109 ||  || — || March 9, 2000 || Socorro || LINEAR || V || align=right | 1.5 km || 
|-id=110 bgcolor=#fefefe
| 104110 ||  || — || March 9, 2000 || Socorro || LINEAR || — || align=right | 1.6 km || 
|-id=111 bgcolor=#d6d6d6
| 104111 ||  || — || March 9, 2000 || Socorro || LINEAR || SAN || align=right | 3.5 km || 
|-id=112 bgcolor=#fefefe
| 104112 ||  || — || March 9, 2000 || Socorro || LINEAR || — || align=right | 1.4 km || 
|-id=113 bgcolor=#E9E9E9
| 104113 ||  || — || March 9, 2000 || Socorro || LINEAR || — || align=right | 3.1 km || 
|-id=114 bgcolor=#fefefe
| 104114 ||  || — || March 10, 2000 || Prescott || P. G. Comba || NYS || align=right | 1.3 km || 
|-id=115 bgcolor=#d6d6d6
| 104115 ||  || — || March 3, 2000 || Kitt Peak || Spacewatch || KOR || align=right | 2.0 km || 
|-id=116 bgcolor=#d6d6d6
| 104116 ||  || — || March 3, 2000 || Kitt Peak || Spacewatch || — || align=right | 5.6 km || 
|-id=117 bgcolor=#fefefe
| 104117 ||  || — || March 3, 2000 || Kitt Peak || Spacewatch || FLO || align=right | 1.3 km || 
|-id=118 bgcolor=#E9E9E9
| 104118 ||  || — || March 9, 2000 || Kitt Peak || Spacewatch || — || align=right | 1.7 km || 
|-id=119 bgcolor=#d6d6d6
| 104119 ||  || — || March 9, 2000 || Kitt Peak || Spacewatch || — || align=right | 5.4 km || 
|-id=120 bgcolor=#d6d6d6
| 104120 ||  || — || March 10, 2000 || Kitt Peak || Spacewatch || — || align=right | 6.3 km || 
|-id=121 bgcolor=#fefefe
| 104121 ||  || — || March 5, 2000 || Socorro || LINEAR || — || align=right | 1.9 km || 
|-id=122 bgcolor=#E9E9E9
| 104122 ||  || — || March 8, 2000 || Socorro || LINEAR || — || align=right | 2.2 km || 
|-id=123 bgcolor=#fefefe
| 104123 ||  || — || March 8, 2000 || Socorro || LINEAR || — || align=right | 1.5 km || 
|-id=124 bgcolor=#E9E9E9
| 104124 ||  || — || March 8, 2000 || Socorro || LINEAR || — || align=right | 1.6 km || 
|-id=125 bgcolor=#fefefe
| 104125 ||  || — || March 8, 2000 || Socorro || LINEAR || H || align=right | 1.5 km || 
|-id=126 bgcolor=#d6d6d6
| 104126 ||  || — || March 8, 2000 || Socorro || LINEAR || TEL || align=right | 2.7 km || 
|-id=127 bgcolor=#d6d6d6
| 104127 ||  || — || March 9, 2000 || Socorro || LINEAR || — || align=right | 5.4 km || 
|-id=128 bgcolor=#d6d6d6
| 104128 ||  || — || March 9, 2000 || Socorro || LINEAR || EOS || align=right | 3.5 km || 
|-id=129 bgcolor=#E9E9E9
| 104129 ||  || — || March 10, 2000 || Socorro || LINEAR || — || align=right | 2.6 km || 
|-id=130 bgcolor=#d6d6d6
| 104130 ||  || — || March 10, 2000 || Socorro || LINEAR || EOS || align=right | 3.8 km || 
|-id=131 bgcolor=#E9E9E9
| 104131 ||  || — || March 10, 2000 || Socorro || LINEAR || JUN || align=right | 1.7 km || 
|-id=132 bgcolor=#d6d6d6
| 104132 ||  || — || March 10, 2000 || Socorro || LINEAR || — || align=right | 8.1 km || 
|-id=133 bgcolor=#E9E9E9
| 104133 ||  || — || March 10, 2000 || Socorro || LINEAR || RAF || align=right | 1.4 km || 
|-id=134 bgcolor=#d6d6d6
| 104134 ||  || — || March 10, 2000 || Socorro || LINEAR || KOR || align=right | 3.2 km || 
|-id=135 bgcolor=#E9E9E9
| 104135 ||  || — || March 10, 2000 || Socorro || LINEAR || — || align=right | 4.0 km || 
|-id=136 bgcolor=#fefefe
| 104136 ||  || — || March 10, 2000 || Socorro || LINEAR || NYS || align=right | 2.6 km || 
|-id=137 bgcolor=#fefefe
| 104137 ||  || — || March 10, 2000 || Socorro || LINEAR || — || align=right | 1.3 km || 
|-id=138 bgcolor=#d6d6d6
| 104138 ||  || — || March 10, 2000 || Socorro || LINEAR || — || align=right | 4.3 km || 
|-id=139 bgcolor=#E9E9E9
| 104139 ||  || — || March 10, 2000 || Socorro || LINEAR || GEF || align=right | 2.5 km || 
|-id=140 bgcolor=#d6d6d6
| 104140 ||  || — || March 10, 2000 || Socorro || LINEAR || — || align=right | 6.0 km || 
|-id=141 bgcolor=#d6d6d6
| 104141 ||  || — || March 10, 2000 || Socorro || LINEAR || — || align=right | 3.8 km || 
|-id=142 bgcolor=#d6d6d6
| 104142 ||  || — || March 10, 2000 || Socorro || LINEAR || NAE || align=right | 5.6 km || 
|-id=143 bgcolor=#d6d6d6
| 104143 ||  || — || March 10, 2000 || Socorro || LINEAR || — || align=right | 4.9 km || 
|-id=144 bgcolor=#d6d6d6
| 104144 ||  || — || March 10, 2000 || Socorro || LINEAR || — || align=right | 6.7 km || 
|-id=145 bgcolor=#d6d6d6
| 104145 ||  || — || March 10, 2000 || Socorro || LINEAR || THM || align=right | 5.6 km || 
|-id=146 bgcolor=#E9E9E9
| 104146 ||  || — || March 10, 2000 || Socorro || LINEAR || — || align=right | 4.6 km || 
|-id=147 bgcolor=#E9E9E9
| 104147 ||  || — || March 10, 2000 || Socorro || LINEAR || — || align=right | 6.0 km || 
|-id=148 bgcolor=#E9E9E9
| 104148 ||  || — || March 10, 2000 || Socorro || LINEAR || — || align=right | 3.6 km || 
|-id=149 bgcolor=#d6d6d6
| 104149 ||  || — || March 10, 2000 || Socorro || LINEAR || — || align=right | 2.7 km || 
|-id=150 bgcolor=#d6d6d6
| 104150 ||  || — || March 10, 2000 || Socorro || LINEAR || — || align=right | 3.1 km || 
|-id=151 bgcolor=#d6d6d6
| 104151 ||  || — || March 10, 2000 || Socorro || LINEAR || KOR || align=right | 2.9 km || 
|-id=152 bgcolor=#d6d6d6
| 104152 ||  || — || March 10, 2000 || Socorro || LINEAR || THM || align=right | 4.3 km || 
|-id=153 bgcolor=#E9E9E9
| 104153 ||  || — || March 10, 2000 || Socorro || LINEAR || — || align=right | 4.8 km || 
|-id=154 bgcolor=#d6d6d6
| 104154 ||  || — || March 10, 2000 || Socorro || LINEAR || EUP || align=right | 9.6 km || 
|-id=155 bgcolor=#E9E9E9
| 104155 ||  || — || March 10, 2000 || Socorro || LINEAR || RAF || align=right | 1.8 km || 
|-id=156 bgcolor=#fefefe
| 104156 ||  || — || March 10, 2000 || Socorro || LINEAR || — || align=right | 1.3 km || 
|-id=157 bgcolor=#d6d6d6
| 104157 ||  || — || March 10, 2000 || Socorro || LINEAR || TIR || align=right | 3.3 km || 
|-id=158 bgcolor=#d6d6d6
| 104158 ||  || — || March 10, 2000 || Socorro || LINEAR || — || align=right | 6.9 km || 
|-id=159 bgcolor=#fefefe
| 104159 ||  || — || March 10, 2000 || Kitt Peak || Spacewatch || MAS || align=right | 1.4 km || 
|-id=160 bgcolor=#d6d6d6
| 104160 ||  || — || March 10, 2000 || Kitt Peak || Spacewatch || TEL || align=right | 4.2 km || 
|-id=161 bgcolor=#d6d6d6
| 104161 ||  || — || March 5, 2000 || Socorro || LINEAR || — || align=right | 4.6 km || 
|-id=162 bgcolor=#fefefe
| 104162 ||  || — || March 5, 2000 || Socorro || LINEAR || FLO || align=right | 1.3 km || 
|-id=163 bgcolor=#fefefe
| 104163 ||  || — || March 5, 2000 || Socorro || LINEAR || — || align=right | 1.8 km || 
|-id=164 bgcolor=#d6d6d6
| 104164 ||  || — || March 5, 2000 || Socorro || LINEAR || — || align=right | 6.3 km || 
|-id=165 bgcolor=#E9E9E9
| 104165 ||  || — || March 5, 2000 || Socorro || LINEAR || AGN || align=right | 2.6 km || 
|-id=166 bgcolor=#d6d6d6
| 104166 ||  || — || March 5, 2000 || Socorro || LINEAR || — || align=right | 5.4 km || 
|-id=167 bgcolor=#d6d6d6
| 104167 ||  || — || March 5, 2000 || Socorro || LINEAR || — || align=right | 5.5 km || 
|-id=168 bgcolor=#E9E9E9
| 104168 ||  || — || March 5, 2000 || Socorro || LINEAR || WIT || align=right | 2.8 km || 
|-id=169 bgcolor=#d6d6d6
| 104169 ||  || — || March 5, 2000 || Socorro || LINEAR || HYG || align=right | 8.0 km || 
|-id=170 bgcolor=#fefefe
| 104170 ||  || — || March 5, 2000 || Socorro || LINEAR || — || align=right | 1.5 km || 
|-id=171 bgcolor=#fefefe
| 104171 ||  || — || March 5, 2000 || Socorro || LINEAR || — || align=right | 1.9 km || 
|-id=172 bgcolor=#d6d6d6
| 104172 ||  || — || March 5, 2000 || Socorro || LINEAR || — || align=right | 4.1 km || 
|-id=173 bgcolor=#d6d6d6
| 104173 ||  || — || March 5, 2000 || Socorro || LINEAR || SAN || align=right | 4.7 km || 
|-id=174 bgcolor=#d6d6d6
| 104174 ||  || — || March 5, 2000 || Socorro || LINEAR || — || align=right | 5.4 km || 
|-id=175 bgcolor=#E9E9E9
| 104175 ||  || — || March 6, 2000 || Socorro || LINEAR || — || align=right | 5.1 km || 
|-id=176 bgcolor=#E9E9E9
| 104176 ||  || — || March 8, 2000 || Socorro || LINEAR || — || align=right | 2.3 km || 
|-id=177 bgcolor=#fefefe
| 104177 ||  || — || March 8, 2000 || Socorro || LINEAR || NYS || align=right | 1.6 km || 
|-id=178 bgcolor=#fefefe
| 104178 ||  || — || March 9, 2000 || Socorro || LINEAR || V || align=right | 1.6 km || 
|-id=179 bgcolor=#E9E9E9
| 104179 ||  || — || March 9, 2000 || Socorro || LINEAR || — || align=right | 3.4 km || 
|-id=180 bgcolor=#E9E9E9
| 104180 ||  || — || March 9, 2000 || Socorro || LINEAR || — || align=right | 5.6 km || 
|-id=181 bgcolor=#d6d6d6
| 104181 ||  || — || March 11, 2000 || Socorro || LINEAR || — || align=right | 4.2 km || 
|-id=182 bgcolor=#fefefe
| 104182 ||  || — || March 11, 2000 || Socorro || LINEAR || Vslow || align=right | 1.4 km || 
|-id=183 bgcolor=#fefefe
| 104183 ||  || — || March 11, 2000 || Socorro || LINEAR || MAS || align=right | 1.4 km || 
|-id=184 bgcolor=#d6d6d6
| 104184 ||  || — || March 11, 2000 || Socorro || LINEAR || EUP || align=right | 7.2 km || 
|-id=185 bgcolor=#E9E9E9
| 104185 ||  || — || March 9, 2000 || Kitt Peak || Spacewatch || — || align=right | 2.1 km || 
|-id=186 bgcolor=#E9E9E9
| 104186 ||  || — || March 9, 2000 || Kitt Peak || Spacewatch || — || align=right | 3.3 km || 
|-id=187 bgcolor=#d6d6d6
| 104187 ||  || — || March 9, 2000 || Kitt Peak || Spacewatch || — || align=right | 3.2 km || 
|-id=188 bgcolor=#d6d6d6
| 104188 ||  || — || March 12, 2000 || Kitt Peak || Spacewatch || KOR || align=right | 3.1 km || 
|-id=189 bgcolor=#fefefe
| 104189 ||  || — || March 12, 2000 || Kitt Peak || Spacewatch || NYS || align=right | 1.3 km || 
|-id=190 bgcolor=#d6d6d6
| 104190 ||  || — || March 12, 2000 || Kitt Peak || Spacewatch || KOR || align=right | 1.9 km || 
|-id=191 bgcolor=#d6d6d6
| 104191 ||  || — || March 12, 2000 || Kitt Peak || Spacewatch || KOR || align=right | 2.7 km || 
|-id=192 bgcolor=#E9E9E9
| 104192 ||  || — || March 14, 2000 || Kitt Peak || Spacewatch || HEN || align=right | 1.9 km || 
|-id=193 bgcolor=#E9E9E9
| 104193 ||  || — || March 14, 2000 || Kitt Peak || Spacewatch || — || align=right | 3.2 km || 
|-id=194 bgcolor=#E9E9E9
| 104194 ||  || — || March 11, 2000 || Socorro || LINEAR || — || align=right | 3.6 km || 
|-id=195 bgcolor=#E9E9E9
| 104195 ||  || — || March 12, 2000 || Socorro || LINEAR || HNS || align=right | 3.1 km || 
|-id=196 bgcolor=#E9E9E9
| 104196 ||  || — || March 11, 2000 || Anderson Mesa || LONEOS || — || align=right | 3.1 km || 
|-id=197 bgcolor=#E9E9E9
| 104197 ||  || — || March 11, 2000 || Anderson Mesa || LONEOS || GEF || align=right | 3.4 km || 
|-id=198 bgcolor=#d6d6d6
| 104198 ||  || — || March 11, 2000 || Anderson Mesa || LONEOS || — || align=right | 7.6 km || 
|-id=199 bgcolor=#E9E9E9
| 104199 ||  || — || March 8, 2000 || Socorro || LINEAR || BRU || align=right | 4.5 km || 
|-id=200 bgcolor=#d6d6d6
| 104200 ||  || — || March 8, 2000 || Socorro || LINEAR || — || align=right | 4.3 km || 
|}

104201–104300 

|-bgcolor=#E9E9E9
| 104201 ||  || — || March 8, 2000 || Haleakala || NEAT || — || align=right | 5.1 km || 
|-id=202 bgcolor=#fefefe
| 104202 ||  || — || March 8, 2000 || Socorro || LINEAR || — || align=right | 2.9 km || 
|-id=203 bgcolor=#fefefe
| 104203 ||  || — || March 8, 2000 || Haleakala || NEAT || V || align=right | 1.8 km || 
|-id=204 bgcolor=#d6d6d6
| 104204 ||  || — || March 8, 2000 || Haleakala || NEAT || TIR || align=right | 4.2 km || 
|-id=205 bgcolor=#E9E9E9
| 104205 ||  || — || March 9, 2000 || Socorro || LINEAR || — || align=right | 3.2 km || 
|-id=206 bgcolor=#d6d6d6
| 104206 ||  || — || March 9, 2000 || Socorro || LINEAR || KOR || align=right | 2.8 km || 
|-id=207 bgcolor=#E9E9E9
| 104207 ||  || — || March 9, 2000 || Socorro || LINEAR || — || align=right | 4.7 km || 
|-id=208 bgcolor=#d6d6d6
| 104208 ||  || — || March 9, 2000 || Kitt Peak || Spacewatch || — || align=right | 4.5 km || 
|-id=209 bgcolor=#d6d6d6
| 104209 ||  || — || March 10, 2000 || Kitt Peak || Spacewatch || — || align=right | 3.9 km || 
|-id=210 bgcolor=#E9E9E9
| 104210 Leeupton ||  ||  || March 10, 2000 || Socorro || LINEAR || — || align=right | 2.6 km || 
|-id=211 bgcolor=#fefefe
| 104211 ||  || — || March 10, 2000 || Socorro || LINEAR || — || align=right | 1.4 km || 
|-id=212 bgcolor=#d6d6d6
| 104212 ||  || — || March 11, 2000 || Anderson Mesa || LONEOS || — || align=right | 7.5 km || 
|-id=213 bgcolor=#E9E9E9
| 104213 ||  || — || March 11, 2000 || Anderson Mesa || LONEOS || GEF || align=right | 2.9 km || 
|-id=214 bgcolor=#E9E9E9
| 104214 ||  || — || March 11, 2000 || Anderson Mesa || LONEOS || — || align=right | 5.3 km || 
|-id=215 bgcolor=#E9E9E9
| 104215 ||  || — || March 11, 2000 || Anderson Mesa || LONEOS || — || align=right | 3.2 km || 
|-id=216 bgcolor=#E9E9E9
| 104216 ||  || — || March 11, 2000 || Anderson Mesa || LONEOS || INO || align=right | 2.6 km || 
|-id=217 bgcolor=#d6d6d6
| 104217 ||  || — || March 11, 2000 || Anderson Mesa || LONEOS || TIR || align=right | 4.5 km || 
|-id=218 bgcolor=#E9E9E9
| 104218 ||  || — || March 11, 2000 || Anderson Mesa || LONEOS || CLO || align=right | 4.6 km || 
|-id=219 bgcolor=#E9E9E9
| 104219 ||  || — || March 11, 2000 || Anderson Mesa || LONEOS || — || align=right | 5.0 km || 
|-id=220 bgcolor=#fefefe
| 104220 ||  || — || March 11, 2000 || Anderson Mesa || LONEOS || V || align=right | 1.5 km || 
|-id=221 bgcolor=#d6d6d6
| 104221 ||  || — || March 11, 2000 || Anderson Mesa || LONEOS || EOS || align=right | 8.0 km || 
|-id=222 bgcolor=#E9E9E9
| 104222 ||  || — || March 11, 2000 || Anderson Mesa || LONEOS || — || align=right | 7.2 km || 
|-id=223 bgcolor=#E9E9E9
| 104223 ||  || — || March 11, 2000 || Anderson Mesa || LONEOS || JUN || align=right | 3.0 km || 
|-id=224 bgcolor=#E9E9E9
| 104224 ||  || — || March 11, 2000 || Anderson Mesa || LONEOS || — || align=right | 5.6 km || 
|-id=225 bgcolor=#fefefe
| 104225 ||  || — || March 11, 2000 || Socorro || LINEAR || — || align=right | 1.4 km || 
|-id=226 bgcolor=#d6d6d6
| 104226 ||  || — || March 11, 2000 || Anderson Mesa || LONEOS || KOR || align=right | 3.4 km || 
|-id=227 bgcolor=#d6d6d6
| 104227 ||  || — || March 11, 2000 || Anderson Mesa || LONEOS || — || align=right | 5.7 km || 
|-id=228 bgcolor=#E9E9E9
| 104228 ||  || — || March 11, 2000 || Anderson Mesa || LONEOS || NEM || align=right | 5.5 km || 
|-id=229 bgcolor=#E9E9E9
| 104229 ||  || — || March 11, 2000 || Anderson Mesa || LONEOS || — || align=right | 4.5 km || 
|-id=230 bgcolor=#E9E9E9
| 104230 ||  || — || March 11, 2000 || Anderson Mesa || LONEOS || GEF || align=right | 2.5 km || 
|-id=231 bgcolor=#E9E9E9
| 104231 ||  || — || March 11, 2000 || Anderson Mesa || LONEOS || — || align=right | 4.7 km || 
|-id=232 bgcolor=#E9E9E9
| 104232 ||  || — || March 11, 2000 || Anderson Mesa || LONEOS || — || align=right | 4.4 km || 
|-id=233 bgcolor=#fefefe
| 104233 ||  || — || March 11, 2000 || Anderson Mesa || LONEOS || — || align=right | 1.7 km || 
|-id=234 bgcolor=#fefefe
| 104234 ||  || — || March 11, 2000 || Anderson Mesa || LONEOS || MAS || align=right | 1.6 km || 
|-id=235 bgcolor=#d6d6d6
| 104235 ||  || — || March 11, 2000 || Socorro || LINEAR || — || align=right | 3.1 km || 
|-id=236 bgcolor=#E9E9E9
| 104236 ||  || — || March 11, 2000 || Socorro || LINEAR || — || align=right | 2.2 km || 
|-id=237 bgcolor=#E9E9E9
| 104237 ||  || — || March 11, 2000 || Socorro || LINEAR || — || align=right | 2.2 km || 
|-id=238 bgcolor=#E9E9E9
| 104238 ||  || — || March 11, 2000 || Socorro || LINEAR || AGN || align=right | 2.9 km || 
|-id=239 bgcolor=#fefefe
| 104239 ||  || — || March 11, 2000 || Socorro || LINEAR || FLO || align=right | 1.2 km || 
|-id=240 bgcolor=#d6d6d6
| 104240 ||  || — || March 11, 2000 || Anderson Mesa || LONEOS || EOS || align=right | 3.9 km || 
|-id=241 bgcolor=#E9E9E9
| 104241 ||  || — || March 11, 2000 || Anderson Mesa || LONEOS || — || align=right | 5.1 km || 
|-id=242 bgcolor=#fefefe
| 104242 ||  || — || March 11, 2000 || Anderson Mesa || LONEOS || — || align=right | 2.0 km || 
|-id=243 bgcolor=#fefefe
| 104243 ||  || — || March 11, 2000 || Anderson Mesa || LONEOS || NYS || align=right | 1.2 km || 
|-id=244 bgcolor=#d6d6d6
| 104244 ||  || — || March 11, 2000 || Anderson Mesa || LONEOS || — || align=right | 3.6 km || 
|-id=245 bgcolor=#d6d6d6
| 104245 ||  || — || March 11, 2000 || Anderson Mesa || LONEOS || — || align=right | 2.9 km || 
|-id=246 bgcolor=#E9E9E9
| 104246 ||  || — || March 11, 2000 || Anderson Mesa || LONEOS || — || align=right | 3.5 km || 
|-id=247 bgcolor=#d6d6d6
| 104247 ||  || — || March 11, 2000 || Socorro || LINEAR || EOS || align=right | 4.0 km || 
|-id=248 bgcolor=#d6d6d6
| 104248 ||  || — || March 11, 2000 || Socorro || LINEAR || — || align=right | 4.0 km || 
|-id=249 bgcolor=#E9E9E9
| 104249 ||  || — || March 12, 2000 || Socorro || LINEAR || — || align=right | 3.4 km || 
|-id=250 bgcolor=#E9E9E9
| 104250 ||  || — || March 12, 2000 || Socorro || LINEAR || — || align=right | 3.2 km || 
|-id=251 bgcolor=#d6d6d6
| 104251 ||  || — || March 7, 2000 || Socorro || LINEAR || — || align=right | 4.6 km || 
|-id=252 bgcolor=#d6d6d6
| 104252 ||  || — || March 11, 2000 || Socorro || LINEAR || — || align=right | 4.8 km || 
|-id=253 bgcolor=#E9E9E9
| 104253 ||  || — || March 11, 2000 || Socorro || LINEAR || — || align=right | 4.0 km || 
|-id=254 bgcolor=#E9E9E9
| 104254 ||  || — || March 12, 2000 || Catalina || CSS || — || align=right | 2.9 km || 
|-id=255 bgcolor=#E9E9E9
| 104255 ||  || — || March 1, 2000 || Catalina || CSS || — || align=right | 5.4 km || 
|-id=256 bgcolor=#fefefe
| 104256 ||  || — || March 2, 2000 || Catalina || CSS || FLO || align=right | 1.7 km || 
|-id=257 bgcolor=#E9E9E9
| 104257 ||  || — || March 2, 2000 || Catalina || CSS || — || align=right | 2.6 km || 
|-id=258 bgcolor=#d6d6d6
| 104258 ||  || — || March 2, 2000 || Catalina || CSS || — || align=right | 9.9 km || 
|-id=259 bgcolor=#E9E9E9
| 104259 ||  || — || March 3, 2000 || Kitt Peak || Spacewatch || AEO || align=right | 2.0 km || 
|-id=260 bgcolor=#d6d6d6
| 104260 ||  || — || March 3, 2000 || Catalina || CSS || — || align=right | 4.7 km || 
|-id=261 bgcolor=#d6d6d6
| 104261 ||  || — || March 3, 2000 || Kitt Peak || Spacewatch || KOR || align=right | 2.3 km || 
|-id=262 bgcolor=#E9E9E9
| 104262 ||  || — || March 3, 2000 || Catalina || CSS || WIT || align=right | 2.6 km || 
|-id=263 bgcolor=#d6d6d6
| 104263 ||  || — || March 3, 2000 || Catalina || CSS || MEL || align=right | 8.0 km || 
|-id=264 bgcolor=#E9E9E9
| 104264 ||  || — || March 3, 2000 || Haleakala || NEAT || — || align=right | 3.4 km || 
|-id=265 bgcolor=#E9E9E9
| 104265 ||  || — || March 4, 2000 || Catalina || CSS || EUN || align=right | 2.3 km || 
|-id=266 bgcolor=#E9E9E9
| 104266 ||  || — || March 4, 2000 || Socorro || LINEAR || — || align=right | 5.1 km || 
|-id=267 bgcolor=#d6d6d6
| 104267 ||  || — || March 4, 2000 || Catalina || CSS || — || align=right | 5.4 km || 
|-id=268 bgcolor=#d6d6d6
| 104268 ||  || — || March 4, 2000 || Catalina || CSS || EOS || align=right | 5.0 km || 
|-id=269 bgcolor=#d6d6d6
| 104269 ||  || — || March 4, 2000 || Catalina || CSS || URS || align=right | 11 km || 
|-id=270 bgcolor=#fefefe
| 104270 ||  || — || March 5, 2000 || Socorro || LINEAR || — || align=right | 1.7 km || 
|-id=271 bgcolor=#E9E9E9
| 104271 ||  || — || March 5, 2000 || Socorro || LINEAR || — || align=right | 2.4 km || 
|-id=272 bgcolor=#d6d6d6
| 104272 ||  || — || March 5, 2000 || Socorro || LINEAR || EOS || align=right | 3.8 km || 
|-id=273 bgcolor=#E9E9E9
| 104273 ||  || — || March 5, 2000 || Socorro || LINEAR || — || align=right | 2.7 km || 
|-id=274 bgcolor=#fefefe
| 104274 ||  || — || March 5, 2000 || Haleakala || NEAT || NYS || align=right | 1.3 km || 
|-id=275 bgcolor=#d6d6d6
| 104275 ||  || — || March 5, 2000 || Haleakala || NEAT || — || align=right | 3.0 km || 
|-id=276 bgcolor=#E9E9E9
| 104276 ||  || — || March 6, 2000 || Socorro || LINEAR || MAR || align=right | 2.2 km || 
|-id=277 bgcolor=#E9E9E9
| 104277 ||  || — || March 6, 2000 || Haleakala || NEAT || — || align=right | 5.4 km || 
|-id=278 bgcolor=#fefefe
| 104278 ||  || — || March 6, 2000 || Haleakala || NEAT || V || align=right | 1.3 km || 
|-id=279 bgcolor=#d6d6d6
| 104279 ||  || — || March 6, 2000 || Haleakala || NEAT || KOR || align=right | 3.2 km || 
|-id=280 bgcolor=#d6d6d6
| 104280 ||  || — || March 6, 2000 || Haleakala || NEAT || TEL || align=right | 3.2 km || 
|-id=281 bgcolor=#E9E9E9
| 104281 ||  || — || March 6, 2000 || Haleakala || NEAT || — || align=right | 3.2 km || 
|-id=282 bgcolor=#fefefe
| 104282 ||  || — || March 9, 2000 || Socorro || LINEAR || — || align=right | 1.9 km || 
|-id=283 bgcolor=#d6d6d6
| 104283 ||  || — || March 9, 2000 || Socorro || LINEAR || — || align=right | 4.1 km || 
|-id=284 bgcolor=#fefefe
| 104284 ||  || — || March 9, 2000 || Socorro || LINEAR || FLO || align=right | 2.3 km || 
|-id=285 bgcolor=#d6d6d6
| 104285 ||  || — || March 9, 2000 || Socorro || LINEAR || EOS || align=right | 5.6 km || 
|-id=286 bgcolor=#d6d6d6
| 104286 ||  || — || March 11, 2000 || Catalina || CSS || TIR || align=right | 6.6 km || 
|-id=287 bgcolor=#d6d6d6
| 104287 ||  || — || March 11, 2000 || Catalina || CSS || LUT || align=right | 8.3 km || 
|-id=288 bgcolor=#d6d6d6
| 104288 ||  || — || March 12, 2000 || Anderson Mesa || LONEOS || — || align=right | 7.3 km || 
|-id=289 bgcolor=#E9E9E9
| 104289 ||  || — || March 12, 2000 || Anderson Mesa || LONEOS || — || align=right | 3.1 km || 
|-id=290 bgcolor=#E9E9E9
| 104290 ||  || — || March 3, 2000 || Socorro || LINEAR || — || align=right | 1.9 km || 
|-id=291 bgcolor=#E9E9E9
| 104291 ||  || — || March 3, 2000 || Socorro || LINEAR || RAF || align=right | 1.6 km || 
|-id=292 bgcolor=#d6d6d6
| 104292 ||  || — || March 3, 2000 || Socorro || LINEAR || — || align=right | 3.7 km || 
|-id=293 bgcolor=#E9E9E9
| 104293 ||  || — || March 4, 2000 || Socorro || LINEAR || — || align=right | 3.9 km || 
|-id=294 bgcolor=#d6d6d6
| 104294 ||  || — || March 4, 2000 || Socorro || LINEAR || — || align=right | 4.9 km || 
|-id=295 bgcolor=#E9E9E9
| 104295 ||  || — || March 4, 2000 || Socorro || LINEAR || EUN || align=right | 4.2 km || 
|-id=296 bgcolor=#d6d6d6
| 104296 ||  || — || March 4, 2000 || Socorro || LINEAR || slow? || align=right | 6.5 km || 
|-id=297 bgcolor=#E9E9E9
| 104297 ||  || — || March 5, 2000 || Socorro || LINEAR || MAR || align=right | 2.5 km || 
|-id=298 bgcolor=#fefefe
| 104298 ||  || — || March 10, 2000 || Socorro || LINEAR || FLO || align=right | 1.4 km || 
|-id=299 bgcolor=#E9E9E9
| 104299 ||  || — || March 4, 2000 || Socorro || LINEAR || — || align=right | 2.4 km || 
|-id=300 bgcolor=#E9E9E9
| 104300 ||  || — || March 1, 2000 || Catalina || CSS || — || align=right | 3.2 km || 
|}

104301–104400 

|-bgcolor=#E9E9E9
| 104301 ||  || — || March 3, 2000 || Socorro || LINEAR || EUN || align=right | 2.1 km || 
|-id=302 bgcolor=#fefefe
| 104302 ||  || — || March 4, 2000 || Socorro || LINEAR || — || align=right | 1.3 km || 
|-id=303 bgcolor=#E9E9E9
| 104303 ||  || — || March 4, 2000 || Socorro || LINEAR || — || align=right | 6.7 km || 
|-id=304 bgcolor=#E9E9E9
| 104304 ||  || — || March 4, 2000 || Socorro || LINEAR || — || align=right | 2.5 km || 
|-id=305 bgcolor=#fefefe
| 104305 ||  || — || March 5, 2000 || Socorro || LINEAR || — || align=right | 2.5 km || 
|-id=306 bgcolor=#fefefe
| 104306 ||  || — || March 5, 2000 || Haleakala || NEAT || — || align=right | 2.5 km || 
|-id=307 bgcolor=#d6d6d6
| 104307 ||  || — || March 2, 2000 || Catalina || CSS || — || align=right | 4.2 km || 
|-id=308 bgcolor=#E9E9E9
| 104308 ||  || — || March 3, 2000 || Kitt Peak || Spacewatch || — || align=right | 4.2 km || 
|-id=309 bgcolor=#d6d6d6
| 104309 ||  || — || March 3, 2000 || Socorro || LINEAR || — || align=right | 5.0 km || 
|-id=310 bgcolor=#E9E9E9
| 104310 ||  || — || March 3, 2000 || Socorro || LINEAR || PAD || align=right | 2.9 km || 
|-id=311 bgcolor=#E9E9E9
| 104311 ||  || — || March 3, 2000 || Socorro || LINEAR || — || align=right | 3.6 km || 
|-id=312 bgcolor=#d6d6d6
| 104312 ||  || — || March 3, 2000 || Socorro || LINEAR || HYG || align=right | 6.1 km || 
|-id=313 bgcolor=#E9E9E9
| 104313 ||  || — || March 15, 2000 || Socorro || LINEAR || — || align=right | 4.5 km || 
|-id=314 bgcolor=#E9E9E9
| 104314 ||  || — || March 5, 2000 || Cerro Tololo || DLS || — || align=right | 3.4 km || 
|-id=315 bgcolor=#E9E9E9
| 104315 || 2000 FO || — || March 25, 2000 || Kitt Peak || Spacewatch || — || align=right | 1.6 km || 
|-id=316 bgcolor=#fefefe
| 104316 ||  || — || March 25, 2000 || Kitt Peak || Spacewatch || V || align=right | 1.4 km || 
|-id=317 bgcolor=#fefefe
| 104317 ||  || — || March 25, 2000 || Kitt Peak || Spacewatch || V || align=right | 1.3 km || 
|-id=318 bgcolor=#d6d6d6
| 104318 ||  || — || March 25, 2000 || Kitt Peak || Spacewatch || — || align=right | 3.7 km || 
|-id=319 bgcolor=#E9E9E9
| 104319 ||  || — || March 25, 2000 || Kitt Peak || Spacewatch || ADE || align=right | 6.2 km || 
|-id=320 bgcolor=#fefefe
| 104320 ||  || — || March 26, 2000 || Kitt Peak || Spacewatch || — || align=right | 1.5 km || 
|-id=321 bgcolor=#E9E9E9
| 104321 ||  || — || March 28, 2000 || Socorro || LINEAR || — || align=right | 2.0 km || 
|-id=322 bgcolor=#d6d6d6
| 104322 ||  || — || March 27, 2000 || Kitt Peak || Spacewatch || — || align=right | 5.8 km || 
|-id=323 bgcolor=#fefefe
| 104323 ||  || — || March 27, 2000 || Kitt Peak || Spacewatch || MAS || align=right | 1.7 km || 
|-id=324 bgcolor=#d6d6d6
| 104324 ||  || — || March 27, 2000 || Kitt Peak || Spacewatch || — || align=right | 3.4 km || 
|-id=325 bgcolor=#d6d6d6
| 104325 ||  || — || March 25, 2000 || Kitt Peak || Spacewatch || — || align=right | 3.6 km || 
|-id=326 bgcolor=#d6d6d6
| 104326 ||  || — || March 29, 2000 || Kitt Peak || Spacewatch || HYG || align=right | 5.5 km || 
|-id=327 bgcolor=#E9E9E9
| 104327 ||  || — || March 29, 2000 || Kitt Peak || Spacewatch || — || align=right | 3.2 km || 
|-id=328 bgcolor=#d6d6d6
| 104328 ||  || — || March 29, 2000 || Socorro || LINEAR || — || align=right | 7.6 km || 
|-id=329 bgcolor=#d6d6d6
| 104329 ||  || — || March 25, 2000 || Kleť || Kleť Obs. || — || align=right | 7.0 km || 
|-id=330 bgcolor=#d6d6d6
| 104330 ||  || — || March 29, 2000 || Kitt Peak || Spacewatch || — || align=right | 5.5 km || 
|-id=331 bgcolor=#d6d6d6
| 104331 ||  || — || March 29, 2000 || Kitt Peak || Spacewatch || HYG || align=right | 4.5 km || 
|-id=332 bgcolor=#fefefe
| 104332 ||  || — || March 29, 2000 || Kitt Peak || Spacewatch || NYS || align=right | 1.3 km || 
|-id=333 bgcolor=#d6d6d6
| 104333 ||  || — || March 30, 2000 || Kitt Peak || Spacewatch || — || align=right | 3.3 km || 
|-id=334 bgcolor=#d6d6d6
| 104334 ||  || — || March 30, 2000 || Kitt Peak || Spacewatch || KOR || align=right | 3.3 km || 
|-id=335 bgcolor=#E9E9E9
| 104335 ||  || — || March 28, 2000 || Socorro || LINEAR || — || align=right | 7.7 km || 
|-id=336 bgcolor=#d6d6d6
| 104336 ||  || — || March 28, 2000 || Socorro || LINEAR || 7:4 || align=right | 9.6 km || 
|-id=337 bgcolor=#E9E9E9
| 104337 ||  || — || March 28, 2000 || Socorro || LINEAR || — || align=right | 3.5 km || 
|-id=338 bgcolor=#d6d6d6
| 104338 ||  || — || March 29, 2000 || Socorro || LINEAR || — || align=right | 8.5 km || 
|-id=339 bgcolor=#E9E9E9
| 104339 ||  || — || March 29, 2000 || Socorro || LINEAR || EUN || align=right | 3.3 km || 
|-id=340 bgcolor=#E9E9E9
| 104340 ||  || — || March 29, 2000 || Socorro || LINEAR || MIT || align=right | 5.3 km || 
|-id=341 bgcolor=#E9E9E9
| 104341 ||  || — || March 29, 2000 || Socorro || LINEAR || — || align=right | 2.6 km || 
|-id=342 bgcolor=#E9E9E9
| 104342 ||  || — || March 29, 2000 || Socorro || LINEAR || — || align=right | 2.9 km || 
|-id=343 bgcolor=#E9E9E9
| 104343 ||  || — || March 28, 2000 || Socorro || LINEAR || — || align=right | 3.2 km || 
|-id=344 bgcolor=#E9E9E9
| 104344 ||  || — || March 28, 2000 || Socorro || LINEAR || GEF || align=right | 2.1 km || 
|-id=345 bgcolor=#d6d6d6
| 104345 ||  || — || March 28, 2000 || Socorro || LINEAR || — || align=right | 5.9 km || 
|-id=346 bgcolor=#d6d6d6
| 104346 ||  || — || March 28, 2000 || Socorro || LINEAR || EUP || align=right | 6.9 km || 
|-id=347 bgcolor=#fefefe
| 104347 ||  || — || March 28, 2000 || Socorro || LINEAR || — || align=right | 1.8 km || 
|-id=348 bgcolor=#E9E9E9
| 104348 ||  || — || March 29, 2000 || Socorro || LINEAR || MAR || align=right | 2.4 km || 
|-id=349 bgcolor=#fefefe
| 104349 ||  || — || March 29, 2000 || Socorro || LINEAR || — || align=right | 1.9 km || 
|-id=350 bgcolor=#d6d6d6
| 104350 ||  || — || March 29, 2000 || Socorro || LINEAR || BRA || align=right | 3.7 km || 
|-id=351 bgcolor=#E9E9E9
| 104351 ||  || — || March 29, 2000 || Socorro || LINEAR || — || align=right | 3.5 km || 
|-id=352 bgcolor=#E9E9E9
| 104352 ||  || — || March 29, 2000 || Socorro || LINEAR || — || align=right | 3.2 km || 
|-id=353 bgcolor=#d6d6d6
| 104353 ||  || — || March 29, 2000 || Socorro || LINEAR || — || align=right | 6.4 km || 
|-id=354 bgcolor=#d6d6d6
| 104354 ||  || — || March 29, 2000 || Socorro || LINEAR || — || align=right | 4.4 km || 
|-id=355 bgcolor=#d6d6d6
| 104355 ||  || — || March 29, 2000 || Socorro || LINEAR || — || align=right | 4.7 km || 
|-id=356 bgcolor=#E9E9E9
| 104356 ||  || — || March 29, 2000 || Socorro || LINEAR || — || align=right | 3.1 km || 
|-id=357 bgcolor=#E9E9E9
| 104357 ||  || — || March 29, 2000 || Socorro || LINEAR || — || align=right | 2.9 km || 
|-id=358 bgcolor=#E9E9E9
| 104358 ||  || — || March 29, 2000 || Socorro || LINEAR || — || align=right | 2.0 km || 
|-id=359 bgcolor=#E9E9E9
| 104359 ||  || — || March 29, 2000 || Socorro || LINEAR || GEF || align=right | 2.5 km || 
|-id=360 bgcolor=#E9E9E9
| 104360 ||  || — || March 29, 2000 || Socorro || LINEAR || MAR || align=right | 3.1 km || 
|-id=361 bgcolor=#d6d6d6
| 104361 ||  || — || March 29, 2000 || Socorro || LINEAR || EOS || align=right | 4.4 km || 
|-id=362 bgcolor=#fefefe
| 104362 ||  || — || March 29, 2000 || Socorro || LINEAR || NYS || align=right | 1.5 km || 
|-id=363 bgcolor=#d6d6d6
| 104363 ||  || — || March 29, 2000 || Socorro || LINEAR || — || align=right | 4.0 km || 
|-id=364 bgcolor=#E9E9E9
| 104364 ||  || — || March 27, 2000 || Anderson Mesa || LONEOS || HOF || align=right | 7.1 km || 
|-id=365 bgcolor=#E9E9E9
| 104365 ||  || — || March 27, 2000 || Anderson Mesa || LONEOS || — || align=right | 2.1 km || 
|-id=366 bgcolor=#d6d6d6
| 104366 ||  || — || March 27, 2000 || Anderson Mesa || LONEOS || THM || align=right | 5.0 km || 
|-id=367 bgcolor=#d6d6d6
| 104367 ||  || — || March 27, 2000 || Anderson Mesa || LONEOS || ALA || align=right | 8.0 km || 
|-id=368 bgcolor=#d6d6d6
| 104368 ||  || — || March 27, 2000 || Anderson Mesa || LONEOS || KOR || align=right | 2.9 km || 
|-id=369 bgcolor=#d6d6d6
| 104369 ||  || — || March 27, 2000 || Anderson Mesa || LONEOS || — || align=right | 5.3 km || 
|-id=370 bgcolor=#d6d6d6
| 104370 ||  || — || March 27, 2000 || Anderson Mesa || LONEOS || EMA || align=right | 6.9 km || 
|-id=371 bgcolor=#d6d6d6
| 104371 ||  || — || March 27, 2000 || Anderson Mesa || LONEOS || — || align=right | 6.9 km || 
|-id=372 bgcolor=#d6d6d6
| 104372 ||  || — || March 27, 2000 || Anderson Mesa || LONEOS || HYG || align=right | 4.8 km || 
|-id=373 bgcolor=#E9E9E9
| 104373 ||  || — || March 27, 2000 || Anderson Mesa || LONEOS || — || align=right | 2.3 km || 
|-id=374 bgcolor=#d6d6d6
| 104374 ||  || — || March 27, 2000 || Anderson Mesa || LONEOS || — || align=right | 6.6 km || 
|-id=375 bgcolor=#E9E9E9
| 104375 ||  || — || March 28, 2000 || Socorro || LINEAR || GEF || align=right | 3.3 km || 
|-id=376 bgcolor=#d6d6d6
| 104376 ||  || — || March 29, 2000 || Socorro || LINEAR || EOS || align=right | 4.2 km || 
|-id=377 bgcolor=#d6d6d6
| 104377 ||  || — || March 29, 2000 || Socorro || LINEAR || HYG || align=right | 6.4 km || 
|-id=378 bgcolor=#E9E9E9
| 104378 ||  || — || March 29, 2000 || Socorro || LINEAR || — || align=right | 4.3 km || 
|-id=379 bgcolor=#E9E9E9
| 104379 ||  || — || March 29, 2000 || Socorro || LINEAR || — || align=right | 3.7 km || 
|-id=380 bgcolor=#fefefe
| 104380 ||  || — || March 29, 2000 || Socorro || LINEAR || V || align=right | 1.4 km || 
|-id=381 bgcolor=#E9E9E9
| 104381 ||  || — || March 29, 2000 || Socorro || LINEAR || — || align=right | 3.3 km || 
|-id=382 bgcolor=#E9E9E9
| 104382 ||  || — || March 29, 2000 || Socorro || LINEAR || XIZ || align=right | 3.0 km || 
|-id=383 bgcolor=#E9E9E9
| 104383 ||  || — || March 29, 2000 || Socorro || LINEAR || — || align=right | 6.4 km || 
|-id=384 bgcolor=#fefefe
| 104384 ||  || — || March 29, 2000 || Socorro || LINEAR || V || align=right | 1.4 km || 
|-id=385 bgcolor=#fefefe
| 104385 ||  || — || March 29, 2000 || Socorro || LINEAR || V || align=right | 1.8 km || 
|-id=386 bgcolor=#fefefe
| 104386 ||  || — || March 29, 2000 || Socorro || LINEAR || V || align=right | 1.3 km || 
|-id=387 bgcolor=#fefefe
| 104387 ||  || — || March 29, 2000 || Socorro || LINEAR || — || align=right | 1.5 km || 
|-id=388 bgcolor=#d6d6d6
| 104388 ||  || — || March 29, 2000 || Socorro || LINEAR || EOS || align=right | 4.4 km || 
|-id=389 bgcolor=#E9E9E9
| 104389 ||  || — || March 29, 2000 || Socorro || LINEAR || — || align=right | 4.9 km || 
|-id=390 bgcolor=#E9E9E9
| 104390 ||  || — || March 29, 2000 || Socorro || LINEAR || — || align=right | 2.5 km || 
|-id=391 bgcolor=#E9E9E9
| 104391 ||  || — || March 29, 2000 || Socorro || LINEAR || — || align=right | 2.1 km || 
|-id=392 bgcolor=#d6d6d6
| 104392 ||  || — || March 29, 2000 || Socorro || LINEAR || — || align=right | 6.0 km || 
|-id=393 bgcolor=#d6d6d6
| 104393 ||  || — || March 29, 2000 || Socorro || LINEAR || — || align=right | 8.0 km || 
|-id=394 bgcolor=#E9E9E9
| 104394 ||  || — || March 29, 2000 || Socorro || LINEAR || — || align=right | 3.5 km || 
|-id=395 bgcolor=#d6d6d6
| 104395 ||  || — || March 29, 2000 || Socorro || LINEAR || — || align=right | 4.9 km || 
|-id=396 bgcolor=#fefefe
| 104396 ||  || — || March 29, 2000 || Socorro || LINEAR || — || align=right | 3.7 km || 
|-id=397 bgcolor=#fefefe
| 104397 ||  || — || March 29, 2000 || Socorro || LINEAR || — || align=right | 4.7 km || 
|-id=398 bgcolor=#E9E9E9
| 104398 ||  || — || March 29, 2000 || Socorro || LINEAR || — || align=right | 2.0 km || 
|-id=399 bgcolor=#d6d6d6
| 104399 ||  || — || March 29, 2000 || Socorro || LINEAR || — || align=right | 4.5 km || 
|-id=400 bgcolor=#fefefe
| 104400 ||  || — || March 29, 2000 || Socorro || LINEAR || — || align=right | 1.6 km || 
|}

104401–104500 

|-bgcolor=#E9E9E9
| 104401 ||  || — || March 29, 2000 || Socorro || LINEAR || — || align=right | 3.4 km || 
|-id=402 bgcolor=#E9E9E9
| 104402 ||  || — || March 29, 2000 || Socorro || LINEAR || — || align=right | 2.4 km || 
|-id=403 bgcolor=#E9E9E9
| 104403 ||  || — || March 29, 2000 || Socorro || LINEAR || — || align=right | 1.9 km || 
|-id=404 bgcolor=#E9E9E9
| 104404 ||  || — || March 29, 2000 || Socorro || LINEAR || ADE || align=right | 6.7 km || 
|-id=405 bgcolor=#E9E9E9
| 104405 ||  || — || March 29, 2000 || Socorro || LINEAR || — || align=right | 3.1 km || 
|-id=406 bgcolor=#d6d6d6
| 104406 ||  || — || March 29, 2000 || Kitt Peak || Spacewatch || — || align=right | 5.1 km || 
|-id=407 bgcolor=#d6d6d6
| 104407 ||  || — || March 29, 2000 || Kitt Peak || Spacewatch || — || align=right | 3.4 km || 
|-id=408 bgcolor=#d6d6d6
| 104408 ||  || — || March 29, 2000 || Kitt Peak || Spacewatch || — || align=right | 4.1 km || 
|-id=409 bgcolor=#d6d6d6
| 104409 ||  || — || March 29, 2000 || Socorro || LINEAR || KAR || align=right | 2.5 km || 
|-id=410 bgcolor=#fefefe
| 104410 ||  || — || March 29, 2000 || Socorro || LINEAR || — || align=right | 1.6 km || 
|-id=411 bgcolor=#E9E9E9
| 104411 ||  || — || March 29, 2000 || Socorro || LINEAR || — || align=right | 2.3 km || 
|-id=412 bgcolor=#E9E9E9
| 104412 ||  || — || March 29, 2000 || Socorro || LINEAR || — || align=right | 1.8 km || 
|-id=413 bgcolor=#d6d6d6
| 104413 ||  || — || March 29, 2000 || Socorro || LINEAR || — || align=right | 4.6 km || 
|-id=414 bgcolor=#d6d6d6
| 104414 ||  || — || March 30, 2000 || Catalina || CSS || EOS || align=right | 5.7 km || 
|-id=415 bgcolor=#d6d6d6
| 104415 ||  || — || March 26, 2000 || Anderson Mesa || LONEOS || KOR || align=right | 3.3 km || 
|-id=416 bgcolor=#d6d6d6
| 104416 ||  || — || March 26, 2000 || Anderson Mesa || LONEOS || VER || align=right | 5.1 km || 
|-id=417 bgcolor=#d6d6d6
| 104417 ||  || — || March 26, 2000 || Anderson Mesa || LONEOS || — || align=right | 4.0 km || 
|-id=418 bgcolor=#E9E9E9
| 104418 ||  || — || March 26, 2000 || Anderson Mesa || LONEOS || — || align=right | 4.2 km || 
|-id=419 bgcolor=#E9E9E9
| 104419 ||  || — || March 27, 2000 || Anderson Mesa || LONEOS || — || align=right | 3.3 km || 
|-id=420 bgcolor=#d6d6d6
| 104420 ||  || — || March 26, 2000 || Anderson Mesa || LONEOS || — || align=right | 3.4 km || 
|-id=421 bgcolor=#E9E9E9
| 104421 ||  || — || March 29, 2000 || Socorro || LINEAR || — || align=right | 3.2 km || 
|-id=422 bgcolor=#E9E9E9
| 104422 ||  || — || March 29, 2000 || Socorro || LINEAR || — || align=right | 4.8 km || 
|-id=423 bgcolor=#d6d6d6
| 104423 ||  || — || March 29, 2000 || Socorro || LINEAR || — || align=right | 4.4 km || 
|-id=424 bgcolor=#d6d6d6
| 104424 ||  || — || March 29, 2000 || Socorro || LINEAR || — || align=right | 6.1 km || 
|-id=425 bgcolor=#d6d6d6
| 104425 ||  || — || March 29, 2000 || Socorro || LINEAR || — || align=right | 5.6 km || 
|-id=426 bgcolor=#fefefe
| 104426 ||  || — || March 29, 2000 || Socorro || LINEAR || — || align=right | 1.9 km || 
|-id=427 bgcolor=#d6d6d6
| 104427 ||  || — || March 26, 2000 || Anderson Mesa || LONEOS || EOS || align=right | 4.7 km || 
|-id=428 bgcolor=#d6d6d6
| 104428 ||  || — || March 26, 2000 || Anderson Mesa || LONEOS || — || align=right | 6.9 km || 
|-id=429 bgcolor=#d6d6d6
| 104429 ||  || — || March 27, 2000 || Anderson Mesa || LONEOS || — || align=right | 6.7 km || 
|-id=430 bgcolor=#E9E9E9
| 104430 ||  || — || March 29, 2000 || Socorro || LINEAR || HOF || align=right | 4.8 km || 
|-id=431 bgcolor=#fefefe
| 104431 ||  || — || March 30, 2000 || Socorro || LINEAR || — || align=right | 3.0 km || 
|-id=432 bgcolor=#d6d6d6
| 104432 ||  || — || March 30, 2000 || Socorro || LINEAR || EOS || align=right | 4.3 km || 
|-id=433 bgcolor=#d6d6d6
| 104433 ||  || — || March 30, 2000 || Kitt Peak || Spacewatch || KOR || align=right | 1.7 km || 
|-id=434 bgcolor=#fefefe
| 104434 ||  || — || March 25, 2000 || Kitt Peak || Spacewatch || — || align=right | 1.6 km || 
|-id=435 bgcolor=#d6d6d6
| 104435 ||  || — || March 25, 2000 || Kitt Peak || Spacewatch || — || align=right | 3.5 km || 
|-id=436 bgcolor=#d6d6d6
| 104436 ||  || — || March 25, 2000 || Kitt Peak || Spacewatch || — || align=right | 6.1 km || 
|-id=437 bgcolor=#fefefe
| 104437 ||  || — || March 25, 2000 || Kitt Peak || Spacewatch || — || align=right | 1.9 km || 
|-id=438 bgcolor=#E9E9E9
| 104438 ||  || — || March 25, 2000 || Kitt Peak || Spacewatch || — || align=right | 4.4 km || 
|-id=439 bgcolor=#d6d6d6
| 104439 ||  || — || March 26, 2000 || Anderson Mesa || LONEOS || NAE || align=right | 5.7 km || 
|-id=440 bgcolor=#E9E9E9
| 104440 ||  || — || March 31, 2000 || Kvistaberg || UDAS || WIT || align=right | 2.6 km || 
|-id=441 bgcolor=#d6d6d6
| 104441 || 2000 GQ || — || April 1, 2000 || Kitt Peak || Spacewatch || KOR || align=right | 3.9 km || 
|-id=442 bgcolor=#fefefe
| 104442 ||  || — || April 2, 2000 || Socorro || LINEAR || H || align=right data-sort-value="0.95" | 950 m || 
|-id=443 bgcolor=#d6d6d6
| 104443 ||  || — || April 3, 2000 || Socorro || LINEAR || — || align=right | 5.4 km || 
|-id=444 bgcolor=#FA8072
| 104444 ||  || — || April 5, 2000 || Socorro || LINEAR || — || align=right | 2.5 km || 
|-id=445 bgcolor=#E9E9E9
| 104445 ||  || — || April 7, 2000 || Prescott || P. G. Comba || — || align=right | 4.6 km || 
|-id=446 bgcolor=#fefefe
| 104446 ||  || — || April 5, 2000 || Socorro || LINEAR || H || align=right | 1.3 km || 
|-id=447 bgcolor=#fefefe
| 104447 ||  || — || April 4, 2000 || Socorro || LINEAR || — || align=right | 2.0 km || 
|-id=448 bgcolor=#d6d6d6
| 104448 ||  || — || April 4, 2000 || Socorro || LINEAR || CHA || align=right | 3.1 km || 
|-id=449 bgcolor=#E9E9E9
| 104449 ||  || — || April 4, 2000 || Socorro || LINEAR || — || align=right | 2.9 km || 
|-id=450 bgcolor=#d6d6d6
| 104450 ||  || — || April 4, 2000 || Socorro || LINEAR || EOS || align=right | 4.4 km || 
|-id=451 bgcolor=#E9E9E9
| 104451 ||  || — || April 4, 2000 || Socorro || LINEAR || — || align=right | 3.8 km || 
|-id=452 bgcolor=#d6d6d6
| 104452 ||  || — || April 4, 2000 || Socorro || LINEAR || 615 || align=right | 3.3 km || 
|-id=453 bgcolor=#E9E9E9
| 104453 ||  || — || April 4, 2000 || Socorro || LINEAR || — || align=right | 9.1 km || 
|-id=454 bgcolor=#E9E9E9
| 104454 ||  || — || April 4, 2000 || Socorro || LINEAR || MAR || align=right | 2.3 km || 
|-id=455 bgcolor=#E9E9E9
| 104455 ||  || — || April 5, 2000 || Socorro || LINEAR || JUN || align=right | 1.8 km || 
|-id=456 bgcolor=#fefefe
| 104456 ||  || — || April 5, 2000 || Socorro || LINEAR || MAS || align=right | 1.4 km || 
|-id=457 bgcolor=#fefefe
| 104457 ||  || — || April 5, 2000 || Socorro || LINEAR || NYS || align=right data-sort-value="0.96" | 960 m || 
|-id=458 bgcolor=#fefefe
| 104458 ||  || — || April 5, 2000 || Socorro || LINEAR || V || align=right | 1.8 km || 
|-id=459 bgcolor=#fefefe
| 104459 ||  || — || April 5, 2000 || Socorro || LINEAR || V || align=right | 1.2 km || 
|-id=460 bgcolor=#E9E9E9
| 104460 ||  || — || April 5, 2000 || Socorro || LINEAR || AST || align=right | 3.5 km || 
|-id=461 bgcolor=#E9E9E9
| 104461 ||  || — || April 5, 2000 || Socorro || LINEAR || — || align=right | 2.7 km || 
|-id=462 bgcolor=#d6d6d6
| 104462 ||  || — || April 5, 2000 || Socorro || LINEAR || — || align=right | 7.3 km || 
|-id=463 bgcolor=#E9E9E9
| 104463 ||  || — || April 5, 2000 || Socorro || LINEAR || HOF || align=right | 6.2 km || 
|-id=464 bgcolor=#d6d6d6
| 104464 ||  || — || April 5, 2000 || Socorro || LINEAR || — || align=right | 7.1 km || 
|-id=465 bgcolor=#fefefe
| 104465 ||  || — || April 5, 2000 || Socorro || LINEAR || MAS || align=right | 1.2 km || 
|-id=466 bgcolor=#d6d6d6
| 104466 ||  || — || April 5, 2000 || Socorro || LINEAR || — || align=right | 5.9 km || 
|-id=467 bgcolor=#fefefe
| 104467 ||  || — || April 5, 2000 || Socorro || LINEAR || — || align=right | 1.2 km || 
|-id=468 bgcolor=#E9E9E9
| 104468 ||  || — || April 5, 2000 || Socorro || LINEAR || — || align=right | 2.6 km || 
|-id=469 bgcolor=#fefefe
| 104469 ||  || — || April 5, 2000 || Socorro || LINEAR || — || align=right | 1.5 km || 
|-id=470 bgcolor=#d6d6d6
| 104470 ||  || — || April 5, 2000 || Socorro || LINEAR || BRA || align=right | 3.2 km || 
|-id=471 bgcolor=#E9E9E9
| 104471 ||  || — || April 5, 2000 || Socorro || LINEAR || — || align=right | 1.8 km || 
|-id=472 bgcolor=#d6d6d6
| 104472 ||  || — || April 5, 2000 || Socorro || LINEAR || KOR || align=right | 2.9 km || 
|-id=473 bgcolor=#d6d6d6
| 104473 ||  || — || April 5, 2000 || Socorro || LINEAR || MEL || align=right | 8.0 km || 
|-id=474 bgcolor=#d6d6d6
| 104474 ||  || — || April 5, 2000 || Socorro || LINEAR || KOR || align=right | 2.9 km || 
|-id=475 bgcolor=#fefefe
| 104475 ||  || — || April 5, 2000 || Socorro || LINEAR || MAS || align=right | 1.0 km || 
|-id=476 bgcolor=#fefefe
| 104476 ||  || — || April 5, 2000 || Socorro || LINEAR || — || align=right | 1.9 km || 
|-id=477 bgcolor=#d6d6d6
| 104477 ||  || — || April 5, 2000 || Socorro || LINEAR || — || align=right | 2.5 km || 
|-id=478 bgcolor=#d6d6d6
| 104478 ||  || — || April 5, 2000 || Socorro || LINEAR || — || align=right | 5.0 km || 
|-id=479 bgcolor=#d6d6d6
| 104479 ||  || — || April 5, 2000 || Socorro || LINEAR || — || align=right | 5.5 km || 
|-id=480 bgcolor=#d6d6d6
| 104480 ||  || — || April 5, 2000 || Socorro || LINEAR || — || align=right | 5.1 km || 
|-id=481 bgcolor=#d6d6d6
| 104481 ||  || — || April 5, 2000 || Socorro || LINEAR || — || align=right | 5.0 km || 
|-id=482 bgcolor=#d6d6d6
| 104482 ||  || — || April 5, 2000 || Socorro || LINEAR || — || align=right | 6.2 km || 
|-id=483 bgcolor=#E9E9E9
| 104483 ||  || — || April 5, 2000 || Socorro || LINEAR || — || align=right | 3.9 km || 
|-id=484 bgcolor=#E9E9E9
| 104484 ||  || — || April 5, 2000 || Socorro || LINEAR || — || align=right | 2.1 km || 
|-id=485 bgcolor=#d6d6d6
| 104485 ||  || — || April 5, 2000 || Socorro || LINEAR || KOR || align=right | 3.0 km || 
|-id=486 bgcolor=#d6d6d6
| 104486 ||  || — || April 5, 2000 || Socorro || LINEAR || — || align=right | 5.1 km || 
|-id=487 bgcolor=#d6d6d6
| 104487 ||  || — || April 5, 2000 || Socorro || LINEAR || KOR || align=right | 3.7 km || 
|-id=488 bgcolor=#fefefe
| 104488 ||  || — || April 5, 2000 || Socorro || LINEAR || NYS || align=right | 1.4 km || 
|-id=489 bgcolor=#E9E9E9
| 104489 ||  || — || April 5, 2000 || Socorro || LINEAR || — || align=right | 2.0 km || 
|-id=490 bgcolor=#E9E9E9
| 104490 ||  || — || April 5, 2000 || Socorro || LINEAR || — || align=right | 4.7 km || 
|-id=491 bgcolor=#E9E9E9
| 104491 ||  || — || April 5, 2000 || Socorro || LINEAR || HEN || align=right | 1.9 km || 
|-id=492 bgcolor=#d6d6d6
| 104492 ||  || — || April 5, 2000 || Socorro || LINEAR || KOR || align=right | 3.2 km || 
|-id=493 bgcolor=#d6d6d6
| 104493 ||  || — || April 5, 2000 || Socorro || LINEAR || — || align=right | 4.3 km || 
|-id=494 bgcolor=#E9E9E9
| 104494 ||  || — || April 5, 2000 || Socorro || LINEAR || — || align=right | 1.5 km || 
|-id=495 bgcolor=#E9E9E9
| 104495 ||  || — || April 5, 2000 || Socorro || LINEAR || — || align=right | 2.3 km || 
|-id=496 bgcolor=#fefefe
| 104496 ||  || — || April 5, 2000 || Socorro || LINEAR || — || align=right | 2.4 km || 
|-id=497 bgcolor=#d6d6d6
| 104497 ||  || — || April 5, 2000 || Socorro || LINEAR || KOR || align=right | 3.6 km || 
|-id=498 bgcolor=#d6d6d6
| 104498 ||  || — || April 5, 2000 || Socorro || LINEAR || — || align=right | 4.3 km || 
|-id=499 bgcolor=#d6d6d6
| 104499 ||  || — || April 5, 2000 || Socorro || LINEAR || — || align=right | 6.4 km || 
|-id=500 bgcolor=#d6d6d6
| 104500 ||  || — || April 5, 2000 || Socorro || LINEAR || KOR || align=right | 3.9 km || 
|}

104501–104600 

|-bgcolor=#fefefe
| 104501 ||  || — || April 5, 2000 || Socorro || LINEAR || — || align=right | 1.5 km || 
|-id=502 bgcolor=#d6d6d6
| 104502 ||  || — || April 5, 2000 || Socorro || LINEAR || BRA || align=right | 3.4 km || 
|-id=503 bgcolor=#fefefe
| 104503 ||  || — || April 5, 2000 || Socorro || LINEAR || — || align=right | 1.7 km || 
|-id=504 bgcolor=#d6d6d6
| 104504 ||  || — || April 5, 2000 || Socorro || LINEAR || — || align=right | 5.2 km || 
|-id=505 bgcolor=#E9E9E9
| 104505 ||  || — || April 5, 2000 || Socorro || LINEAR || ADEslow || align=right | 6.1 km || 
|-id=506 bgcolor=#d6d6d6
| 104506 ||  || — || April 5, 2000 || Socorro || LINEAR || — || align=right | 4.7 km || 
|-id=507 bgcolor=#d6d6d6
| 104507 ||  || — || April 5, 2000 || Socorro || LINEAR || THM || align=right | 4.3 km || 
|-id=508 bgcolor=#E9E9E9
| 104508 ||  || — || April 5, 2000 || Socorro || LINEAR || — || align=right | 1.9 km || 
|-id=509 bgcolor=#E9E9E9
| 104509 ||  || — || April 5, 2000 || Socorro || LINEAR || — || align=right | 3.2 km || 
|-id=510 bgcolor=#d6d6d6
| 104510 ||  || — || April 5, 2000 || Socorro || LINEAR || EOS || align=right | 3.2 km || 
|-id=511 bgcolor=#d6d6d6
| 104511 ||  || — || April 5, 2000 || Socorro || LINEAR || EOS || align=right | 4.8 km || 
|-id=512 bgcolor=#d6d6d6
| 104512 ||  || — || April 5, 2000 || Socorro || LINEAR || — || align=right | 5.1 km || 
|-id=513 bgcolor=#d6d6d6
| 104513 ||  || — || April 5, 2000 || Socorro || LINEAR || — || align=right | 5.2 km || 
|-id=514 bgcolor=#E9E9E9
| 104514 ||  || — || April 5, 2000 || Socorro || LINEAR || GEF || align=right | 3.0 km || 
|-id=515 bgcolor=#fefefe
| 104515 ||  || — || April 5, 2000 || Socorro || LINEAR || — || align=right | 1.1 km || 
|-id=516 bgcolor=#d6d6d6
| 104516 ||  || — || April 5, 2000 || Socorro || LINEAR || — || align=right | 6.3 km || 
|-id=517 bgcolor=#fefefe
| 104517 ||  || — || April 5, 2000 || Socorro || LINEAR || V || align=right | 1.8 km || 
|-id=518 bgcolor=#fefefe
| 104518 ||  || — || April 5, 2000 || Socorro || LINEAR || — || align=right | 2.2 km || 
|-id=519 bgcolor=#d6d6d6
| 104519 ||  || — || April 5, 2000 || Socorro || LINEAR || HYG || align=right | 4.9 km || 
|-id=520 bgcolor=#d6d6d6
| 104520 ||  || — || April 5, 2000 || Socorro || LINEAR || — || align=right | 7.5 km || 
|-id=521 bgcolor=#E9E9E9
| 104521 ||  || — || April 5, 2000 || Socorro || LINEAR || — || align=right | 4.5 km || 
|-id=522 bgcolor=#fefefe
| 104522 ||  || — || April 5, 2000 || Socorro || LINEAR || — || align=right | 1.3 km || 
|-id=523 bgcolor=#d6d6d6
| 104523 ||  || — || April 5, 2000 || Socorro || LINEAR || — || align=right | 5.9 km || 
|-id=524 bgcolor=#d6d6d6
| 104524 ||  || — || April 5, 2000 || Socorro || LINEAR || THM || align=right | 6.6 km || 
|-id=525 bgcolor=#d6d6d6
| 104525 ||  || — || April 5, 2000 || Socorro || LINEAR || EOS || align=right | 3.0 km || 
|-id=526 bgcolor=#E9E9E9
| 104526 ||  || — || April 5, 2000 || Socorro || LINEAR || KON || align=right | 4.1 km || 
|-id=527 bgcolor=#d6d6d6
| 104527 ||  || — || April 5, 2000 || Socorro || LINEAR || — || align=right | 3.4 km || 
|-id=528 bgcolor=#fefefe
| 104528 ||  || — || April 5, 2000 || Socorro || LINEAR || NYS || align=right | 1.8 km || 
|-id=529 bgcolor=#E9E9E9
| 104529 ||  || — || April 5, 2000 || Socorro || LINEAR || — || align=right | 4.4 km || 
|-id=530 bgcolor=#d6d6d6
| 104530 ||  || — || April 5, 2000 || Socorro || LINEAR || — || align=right | 6.1 km || 
|-id=531 bgcolor=#fefefe
| 104531 ||  || — || April 5, 2000 || Socorro || LINEAR || MAS || align=right | 1.3 km || 
|-id=532 bgcolor=#fefefe
| 104532 ||  || — || April 5, 2000 || Socorro || LINEAR || MAS || align=right | 1.2 km || 
|-id=533 bgcolor=#d6d6d6
| 104533 ||  || — || April 5, 2000 || Socorro || LINEAR || — || align=right | 6.9 km || 
|-id=534 bgcolor=#d6d6d6
| 104534 ||  || — || April 5, 2000 || Socorro || LINEAR || — || align=right | 5.5 km || 
|-id=535 bgcolor=#fefefe
| 104535 ||  || — || April 5, 2000 || Socorro || LINEAR || MAS || align=right | 1.1 km || 
|-id=536 bgcolor=#E9E9E9
| 104536 ||  || — || April 5, 2000 || Socorro || LINEAR || — || align=right | 2.8 km || 
|-id=537 bgcolor=#E9E9E9
| 104537 ||  || — || April 5, 2000 || Socorro || LINEAR || JUN || align=right | 1.7 km || 
|-id=538 bgcolor=#fefefe
| 104538 ||  || — || April 5, 2000 || Socorro || LINEAR || NYS || align=right | 1.6 km || 
|-id=539 bgcolor=#fefefe
| 104539 ||  || — || April 5, 2000 || Socorro || LINEAR || — || align=right | 1.6 km || 
|-id=540 bgcolor=#d6d6d6
| 104540 ||  || — || April 5, 2000 || Socorro || LINEAR || — || align=right | 7.9 km || 
|-id=541 bgcolor=#d6d6d6
| 104541 ||  || — || April 5, 2000 || Socorro || LINEAR || — || align=right | 5.2 km || 
|-id=542 bgcolor=#d6d6d6
| 104542 ||  || — || April 5, 2000 || Socorro || LINEAR || — || align=right | 6.8 km || 
|-id=543 bgcolor=#fefefe
| 104543 ||  || — || April 5, 2000 || Socorro || LINEAR || MAS || align=right | 1.2 km || 
|-id=544 bgcolor=#d6d6d6
| 104544 ||  || — || April 5, 2000 || Socorro || LINEAR || CHA || align=right | 4.2 km || 
|-id=545 bgcolor=#d6d6d6
| 104545 ||  || — || April 5, 2000 || Socorro || LINEAR || KOR || align=right | 3.0 km || 
|-id=546 bgcolor=#E9E9E9
| 104546 ||  || — || April 5, 2000 || Socorro || LINEAR || — || align=right | 1.6 km || 
|-id=547 bgcolor=#d6d6d6
| 104547 ||  || — || April 5, 2000 || Socorro || LINEAR || HYG || align=right | 5.9 km || 
|-id=548 bgcolor=#d6d6d6
| 104548 ||  || — || April 5, 2000 || Socorro || LINEAR || THM || align=right | 4.3 km || 
|-id=549 bgcolor=#d6d6d6
| 104549 ||  || — || April 5, 2000 || Socorro || LINEAR || THM || align=right | 4.5 km || 
|-id=550 bgcolor=#d6d6d6
| 104550 ||  || — || April 5, 2000 || Socorro || LINEAR || — || align=right | 4.5 km || 
|-id=551 bgcolor=#d6d6d6
| 104551 ||  || — || April 5, 2000 || Socorro || LINEAR || — || align=right | 5.0 km || 
|-id=552 bgcolor=#d6d6d6
| 104552 ||  || — || April 5, 2000 || Socorro || LINEAR || — || align=right | 4.0 km || 
|-id=553 bgcolor=#fefefe
| 104553 ||  || — || April 5, 2000 || Socorro || LINEAR || — || align=right | 3.5 km || 
|-id=554 bgcolor=#d6d6d6
| 104554 ||  || — || April 5, 2000 || Socorro || LINEAR || — || align=right | 5.0 km || 
|-id=555 bgcolor=#E9E9E9
| 104555 ||  || — || April 5, 2000 || Socorro || LINEAR || — || align=right | 4.4 km || 
|-id=556 bgcolor=#fefefe
| 104556 ||  || — || April 5, 2000 || Socorro || LINEAR || — || align=right | 1.6 km || 
|-id=557 bgcolor=#E9E9E9
| 104557 ||  || — || April 5, 2000 || Socorro || LINEAR || — || align=right | 5.5 km || 
|-id=558 bgcolor=#d6d6d6
| 104558 ||  || — || April 5, 2000 || Socorro || LINEAR || — || align=right | 2.9 km || 
|-id=559 bgcolor=#d6d6d6
| 104559 ||  || — || April 5, 2000 || Socorro || LINEAR || — || align=right | 2.8 km || 
|-id=560 bgcolor=#E9E9E9
| 104560 ||  || — || April 5, 2000 || Socorro || LINEAR || — || align=right | 2.5 km || 
|-id=561 bgcolor=#d6d6d6
| 104561 ||  || — || April 5, 2000 || Socorro || LINEAR || — || align=right | 4.3 km || 
|-id=562 bgcolor=#fefefe
| 104562 ||  || — || April 5, 2000 || Socorro || LINEAR || V || align=right | 1.3 km || 
|-id=563 bgcolor=#fefefe
| 104563 ||  || — || April 5, 2000 || Socorro || LINEAR || NYS || align=right | 1.2 km || 
|-id=564 bgcolor=#d6d6d6
| 104564 ||  || — || April 5, 2000 || Socorro || LINEAR || — || align=right | 5.2 km || 
|-id=565 bgcolor=#d6d6d6
| 104565 ||  || — || April 5, 2000 || Socorro || LINEAR || — || align=right | 3.9 km || 
|-id=566 bgcolor=#d6d6d6
| 104566 ||  || — || April 5, 2000 || Socorro || LINEAR || — || align=right | 7.8 km || 
|-id=567 bgcolor=#d6d6d6
| 104567 ||  || — || April 5, 2000 || Socorro || LINEAR || — || align=right | 7.7 km || 
|-id=568 bgcolor=#d6d6d6
| 104568 ||  || — || April 5, 2000 || Socorro || LINEAR || — || align=right | 4.0 km || 
|-id=569 bgcolor=#d6d6d6
| 104569 ||  || — || April 5, 2000 || Socorro || LINEAR || — || align=right | 6.6 km || 
|-id=570 bgcolor=#E9E9E9
| 104570 ||  || — || April 5, 2000 || Socorro || LINEAR || — || align=right | 3.5 km || 
|-id=571 bgcolor=#fefefe
| 104571 ||  || — || April 5, 2000 || Socorro || LINEAR || NYS || align=right | 1.4 km || 
|-id=572 bgcolor=#d6d6d6
| 104572 ||  || — || April 5, 2000 || Socorro || LINEAR || — || align=right | 5.4 km || 
|-id=573 bgcolor=#d6d6d6
| 104573 ||  || — || April 5, 2000 || Socorro || LINEAR || — || align=right | 5.4 km || 
|-id=574 bgcolor=#d6d6d6
| 104574 ||  || — || April 5, 2000 || Socorro || LINEAR || LIX || align=right | 5.1 km || 
|-id=575 bgcolor=#d6d6d6
| 104575 ||  || — || April 5, 2000 || Socorro || LINEAR || CHA || align=right | 4.2 km || 
|-id=576 bgcolor=#E9E9E9
| 104576 ||  || — || April 6, 2000 || Socorro || LINEAR || — || align=right | 4.6 km || 
|-id=577 bgcolor=#fefefe
| 104577 ||  || — || April 6, 2000 || Socorro || LINEAR || V || align=right | 1.4 km || 
|-id=578 bgcolor=#d6d6d6
| 104578 ||  || — || April 6, 2000 || Socorro || LINEAR || — || align=right | 4.8 km || 
|-id=579 bgcolor=#d6d6d6
| 104579 ||  || — || April 6, 2000 || Socorro || LINEAR || — || align=right | 5.2 km || 
|-id=580 bgcolor=#fefefe
| 104580 ||  || — || April 6, 2000 || Socorro || LINEAR || V || align=right | 1.7 km || 
|-id=581 bgcolor=#fefefe
| 104581 ||  || — || April 7, 2000 || Socorro || LINEAR || H || align=right | 2.0 km || 
|-id=582 bgcolor=#E9E9E9
| 104582 ||  || — || April 3, 2000 || Socorro || LINEAR || — || align=right | 5.3 km || 
|-id=583 bgcolor=#d6d6d6
| 104583 ||  || — || April 3, 2000 || Socorro || LINEAR || TEL || align=right | 3.8 km || 
|-id=584 bgcolor=#d6d6d6
| 104584 ||  || — || April 3, 2000 || Socorro || LINEAR || — || align=right | 3.5 km || 
|-id=585 bgcolor=#E9E9E9
| 104585 ||  || — || April 3, 2000 || Socorro || LINEAR || — || align=right | 2.4 km || 
|-id=586 bgcolor=#E9E9E9
| 104586 ||  || — || April 3, 2000 || Socorro || LINEAR || JUN || align=right | 1.9 km || 
|-id=587 bgcolor=#fefefe
| 104587 ||  || — || April 4, 2000 || Socorro || LINEAR || — || align=right | 1.6 km || 
|-id=588 bgcolor=#d6d6d6
| 104588 ||  || — || April 4, 2000 || Socorro || LINEAR || — || align=right | 7.5 km || 
|-id=589 bgcolor=#d6d6d6
| 104589 ||  || — || April 4, 2000 || Socorro || LINEAR || — || align=right | 3.5 km || 
|-id=590 bgcolor=#d6d6d6
| 104590 ||  || — || April 4, 2000 || Socorro || LINEAR || HYG || align=right | 6.2 km || 
|-id=591 bgcolor=#d6d6d6
| 104591 ||  || — || April 4, 2000 || Socorro || LINEAR || — || align=right | 3.1 km || 
|-id=592 bgcolor=#E9E9E9
| 104592 ||  || — || April 4, 2000 || Socorro || LINEAR || — || align=right | 2.0 km || 
|-id=593 bgcolor=#E9E9E9
| 104593 ||  || — || April 4, 2000 || Socorro || LINEAR || — || align=right | 4.1 km || 
|-id=594 bgcolor=#d6d6d6
| 104594 ||  || — || April 4, 2000 || Socorro || LINEAR || — || align=right | 4.3 km || 
|-id=595 bgcolor=#E9E9E9
| 104595 ||  || — || April 4, 2000 || Socorro || LINEAR || ADE || align=right | 7.6 km || 
|-id=596 bgcolor=#d6d6d6
| 104596 ||  || — || April 4, 2000 || Socorro || LINEAR || EUP || align=right | 10 km || 
|-id=597 bgcolor=#fefefe
| 104597 ||  || — || April 5, 2000 || Socorro || LINEAR || — || align=right | 1.5 km || 
|-id=598 bgcolor=#E9E9E9
| 104598 ||  || — || April 5, 2000 || Socorro || LINEAR || — || align=right | 5.1 km || 
|-id=599 bgcolor=#E9E9E9
| 104599 ||  || — || April 5, 2000 || Socorro || LINEAR || — || align=right | 3.9 km || 
|-id=600 bgcolor=#E9E9E9
| 104600 ||  || — || April 5, 2000 || Socorro || LINEAR || — || align=right | 5.3 km || 
|}

104601–104700 

|-bgcolor=#E9E9E9
| 104601 ||  || — || April 7, 2000 || Socorro || LINEAR || — || align=right | 1.7 km || 
|-id=602 bgcolor=#d6d6d6
| 104602 ||  || — || April 7, 2000 || Socorro || LINEAR || — || align=right | 3.2 km || 
|-id=603 bgcolor=#d6d6d6
| 104603 ||  || — || April 7, 2000 || Socorro || LINEAR || KOR || align=right | 3.7 km || 
|-id=604 bgcolor=#E9E9E9
| 104604 ||  || — || April 7, 2000 || Socorro || LINEAR || — || align=right | 1.7 km || 
|-id=605 bgcolor=#fefefe
| 104605 ||  || — || April 7, 2000 || Socorro || LINEAR || — || align=right | 2.2 km || 
|-id=606 bgcolor=#d6d6d6
| 104606 ||  || — || April 7, 2000 || Socorro || LINEAR || — || align=right | 8.8 km || 
|-id=607 bgcolor=#fefefe
| 104607 ||  || — || April 7, 2000 || Socorro || LINEAR || — || align=right | 1.5 km || 
|-id=608 bgcolor=#d6d6d6
| 104608 ||  || — || April 7, 2000 || Socorro || LINEAR || — || align=right | 3.5 km || 
|-id=609 bgcolor=#E9E9E9
| 104609 ||  || — || April 7, 2000 || Socorro || LINEAR || — || align=right | 2.3 km || 
|-id=610 bgcolor=#fefefe
| 104610 ||  || — || April 7, 2000 || Socorro || LINEAR || — || align=right | 3.8 km || 
|-id=611 bgcolor=#E9E9E9
| 104611 ||  || — || April 7, 2000 || Socorro || LINEAR || — || align=right | 3.1 km || 
|-id=612 bgcolor=#d6d6d6
| 104612 ||  || — || April 7, 2000 || Socorro || LINEAR || — || align=right | 6.4 km || 
|-id=613 bgcolor=#fefefe
| 104613 ||  || — || April 7, 2000 || Socorro || LINEAR || NYS || align=right | 1.4 km || 
|-id=614 bgcolor=#fefefe
| 104614 ||  || — || April 7, 2000 || Socorro || LINEAR || NYS || align=right | 4.3 km || 
|-id=615 bgcolor=#d6d6d6
| 104615 ||  || — || April 7, 2000 || Socorro || LINEAR || TRP || align=right | 5.2 km || 
|-id=616 bgcolor=#E9E9E9
| 104616 ||  || — || April 7, 2000 || Socorro || LINEAR || — || align=right | 4.4 km || 
|-id=617 bgcolor=#fefefe
| 104617 ||  || — || April 2, 2000 || Anderson Mesa || LONEOS || — || align=right | 2.1 km || 
|-id=618 bgcolor=#d6d6d6
| 104618 ||  || — || April 2, 2000 || Anderson Mesa || LONEOS || — || align=right | 5.0 km || 
|-id=619 bgcolor=#d6d6d6
| 104619 ||  || — || April 2, 2000 || Anderson Mesa || LONEOS || — || align=right | 3.3 km || 
|-id=620 bgcolor=#fefefe
| 104620 ||  || — || April 2, 2000 || Anderson Mesa || LONEOS || — || align=right | 1.7 km || 
|-id=621 bgcolor=#E9E9E9
| 104621 ||  || — || April 2, 2000 || Anderson Mesa || LONEOS || — || align=right | 4.7 km || 
|-id=622 bgcolor=#fefefe
| 104622 ||  || — || April 2, 2000 || Anderson Mesa || LONEOS || — || align=right | 1.7 km || 
|-id=623 bgcolor=#d6d6d6
| 104623 ||  || — || April 3, 2000 || Anderson Mesa || LONEOS || EOS || align=right | 4.2 km || 
|-id=624 bgcolor=#d6d6d6
| 104624 ||  || — || April 3, 2000 || Anderson Mesa || LONEOS || — || align=right | 6.8 km || 
|-id=625 bgcolor=#fefefe
| 104625 ||  || — || April 3, 2000 || Anderson Mesa || LONEOS || — || align=right | 1.1 km || 
|-id=626 bgcolor=#E9E9E9
| 104626 ||  || — || April 5, 2000 || Socorro || LINEAR || JUN || align=right | 3.9 km || 
|-id=627 bgcolor=#fefefe
| 104627 ||  || — || April 5, 2000 || Socorro || LINEAR || NYS || align=right | 5.3 km || 
|-id=628 bgcolor=#d6d6d6
| 104628 ||  || — || April 6, 2000 || Socorro || LINEAR || THM || align=right | 5.4 km || 
|-id=629 bgcolor=#d6d6d6
| 104629 ||  || — || April 7, 2000 || Socorro || LINEAR || — || align=right | 4.1 km || 
|-id=630 bgcolor=#E9E9E9
| 104630 ||  || — || April 7, 2000 || Socorro || LINEAR || — || align=right | 4.5 km || 
|-id=631 bgcolor=#fefefe
| 104631 ||  || — || April 7, 2000 || Socorro || LINEAR || — || align=right | 2.3 km || 
|-id=632 bgcolor=#d6d6d6
| 104632 ||  || — || April 8, 2000 || Socorro || LINEAR || — || align=right | 5.6 km || 
|-id=633 bgcolor=#E9E9E9
| 104633 ||  || — || April 8, 2000 || Socorro || LINEAR || — || align=right | 2.6 km || 
|-id=634 bgcolor=#d6d6d6
| 104634 ||  || — || April 2, 2000 || Kitt Peak || Spacewatch || EOS || align=right | 3.8 km || 
|-id=635 bgcolor=#d6d6d6
| 104635 ||  || — || April 2, 2000 || Kitt Peak || Spacewatch || — || align=right | 5.3 km || 
|-id=636 bgcolor=#E9E9E9
| 104636 ||  || — || April 2, 2000 || Kitt Peak || Spacewatch || WIT || align=right | 2.0 km || 
|-id=637 bgcolor=#d6d6d6
| 104637 ||  || — || April 2, 2000 || Kitt Peak || Spacewatch || — || align=right | 4.0 km || 
|-id=638 bgcolor=#d6d6d6
| 104638 ||  || — || April 2, 2000 || Kitt Peak || Spacewatch || KOR || align=right | 2.5 km || 
|-id=639 bgcolor=#d6d6d6
| 104639 ||  || — || April 3, 2000 || Kitt Peak || Spacewatch || KOR || align=right | 3.1 km || 
|-id=640 bgcolor=#E9E9E9
| 104640 ||  || — || April 3, 2000 || Kitt Peak || Spacewatch || HOF || align=right | 4.6 km || 
|-id=641 bgcolor=#fefefe
| 104641 ||  || — || April 5, 2000 || Kitt Peak || Spacewatch || NYS || align=right | 1.3 km || 
|-id=642 bgcolor=#E9E9E9
| 104642 ||  || — || April 6, 2000 || Bergisch Gladbach || W. Bickel || — || align=right | 3.5 km || 
|-id=643 bgcolor=#fefefe
| 104643 ||  || — || April 4, 2000 || Socorro || LINEAR || H || align=right | 1.3 km || 
|-id=644 bgcolor=#E9E9E9
| 104644 ||  || — || April 11, 2000 || Prescott || P. G. Comba || — || align=right | 2.2 km || 
|-id=645 bgcolor=#d6d6d6
| 104645 ||  || — || April 7, 2000 || Socorro || LINEAR || — || align=right | 7.3 km || 
|-id=646 bgcolor=#E9E9E9
| 104646 ||  || — || April 7, 2000 || Socorro || LINEAR || MIT || align=right | 4.9 km || 
|-id=647 bgcolor=#fefefe
| 104647 ||  || — || April 7, 2000 || Socorro || LINEAR || — || align=right | 2.6 km || 
|-id=648 bgcolor=#E9E9E9
| 104648 ||  || — || April 5, 2000 || Kitt Peak || Spacewatch || — || align=right | 3.5 km || 
|-id=649 bgcolor=#fefefe
| 104649 ||  || — || April 10, 2000 || Kitt Peak || Spacewatch || — || align=right | 1.9 km || 
|-id=650 bgcolor=#E9E9E9
| 104650 ||  || — || April 9, 2000 || Ondřejov || P. Kušnirák, U. Babiaková || — || align=right | 2.1 km || 
|-id=651 bgcolor=#FA8072
| 104651 ||  || — || April 12, 2000 || Haleakala || NEAT || H || align=right | 1.5 km || 
|-id=652 bgcolor=#d6d6d6
| 104652 ||  || — || April 7, 2000 || Socorro || LINEAR || — || align=right | 8.5 km || 
|-id=653 bgcolor=#d6d6d6
| 104653 ||  || — || April 7, 2000 || Socorro || LINEAR || — || align=right | 9.1 km || 
|-id=654 bgcolor=#E9E9E9
| 104654 ||  || — || April 8, 2000 || Socorro || LINEAR || MAR || align=right | 1.8 km || 
|-id=655 bgcolor=#E9E9E9
| 104655 ||  || — || April 8, 2000 || Socorro || LINEAR || — || align=right | 4.7 km || 
|-id=656 bgcolor=#d6d6d6
| 104656 ||  || — || April 8, 2000 || Socorro || LINEAR || — || align=right | 4.5 km || 
|-id=657 bgcolor=#d6d6d6
| 104657 ||  || — || April 8, 2000 || Socorro || LINEAR || — || align=right | 4.5 km || 
|-id=658 bgcolor=#E9E9E9
| 104658 ||  || — || April 12, 2000 || Socorro || LINEAR || — || align=right | 3.5 km || 
|-id=659 bgcolor=#E9E9E9
| 104659 ||  || — || April 12, 2000 || Socorro || LINEAR || EUN || align=right | 4.7 km || 
|-id=660 bgcolor=#d6d6d6
| 104660 ||  || — || April 4, 2000 || Anderson Mesa || LONEOS || — || align=right | 4.4 km || 
|-id=661 bgcolor=#d6d6d6
| 104661 ||  || — || April 4, 2000 || Anderson Mesa || LONEOS || — || align=right | 2.8 km || 
|-id=662 bgcolor=#d6d6d6
| 104662 ||  || — || April 4, 2000 || Anderson Mesa || LONEOS || — || align=right | 5.7 km || 
|-id=663 bgcolor=#d6d6d6
| 104663 ||  || — || April 4, 2000 || Anderson Mesa || LONEOS || HYG || align=right | 8.4 km || 
|-id=664 bgcolor=#E9E9E9
| 104664 ||  || — || April 4, 2000 || Anderson Mesa || LONEOS || MRX || align=right | 2.4 km || 
|-id=665 bgcolor=#d6d6d6
| 104665 ||  || — || April 4, 2000 || Anderson Mesa || LONEOS || THM || align=right | 4.0 km || 
|-id=666 bgcolor=#d6d6d6
| 104666 ||  || — || April 6, 2000 || Anderson Mesa || LONEOS || — || align=right | 5.4 km || 
|-id=667 bgcolor=#d6d6d6
| 104667 ||  || — || April 7, 2000 || Anderson Mesa || LONEOS || URS || align=right | 6.1 km || 
|-id=668 bgcolor=#E9E9E9
| 104668 ||  || — || April 7, 2000 || Anderson Mesa || LONEOS || EUN || align=right | 2.8 km || 
|-id=669 bgcolor=#d6d6d6
| 104669 ||  || — || April 7, 2000 || Anderson Mesa || LONEOS || — || align=right | 5.6 km || 
|-id=670 bgcolor=#E9E9E9
| 104670 ||  || — || April 7, 2000 || Anderson Mesa || LONEOS || — || align=right | 4.0 km || 
|-id=671 bgcolor=#d6d6d6
| 104671 ||  || — || April 7, 2000 || Kitt Peak || Spacewatch || THM || align=right | 4.0 km || 
|-id=672 bgcolor=#d6d6d6
| 104672 ||  || — || April 12, 2000 || Kitt Peak || Spacewatch || THM || align=right | 7.1 km || 
|-id=673 bgcolor=#E9E9E9
| 104673 ||  || — || April 8, 2000 || Kitt Peak || Spacewatch || — || align=right | 3.0 km || 
|-id=674 bgcolor=#d6d6d6
| 104674 ||  || — || April 5, 2000 || Socorro || LINEAR || — || align=right | 6.0 km || 
|-id=675 bgcolor=#fefefe
| 104675 ||  || — || April 5, 2000 || Socorro || LINEAR || — || align=right | 2.5 km || 
|-id=676 bgcolor=#E9E9E9
| 104676 ||  || — || April 5, 2000 || Socorro || LINEAR || — || align=right | 3.9 km || 
|-id=677 bgcolor=#d6d6d6
| 104677 ||  || — || April 5, 2000 || Socorro || LINEAR || — || align=right | 6.2 km || 
|-id=678 bgcolor=#d6d6d6
| 104678 ||  || — || April 6, 2000 || Kitt Peak || Spacewatch || KOR || align=right | 3.3 km || 
|-id=679 bgcolor=#d6d6d6
| 104679 ||  || — || April 6, 2000 || Anderson Mesa || LONEOS || — || align=right | 4.7 km || 
|-id=680 bgcolor=#d6d6d6
| 104680 ||  || — || April 6, 2000 || Anderson Mesa || LONEOS || — || align=right | 7.0 km || 
|-id=681 bgcolor=#d6d6d6
| 104681 ||  || — || April 6, 2000 || Anderson Mesa || LONEOS || — || align=right | 8.7 km || 
|-id=682 bgcolor=#d6d6d6
| 104682 ||  || — || April 6, 2000 || Anderson Mesa || LONEOS || — || align=right | 5.6 km || 
|-id=683 bgcolor=#E9E9E9
| 104683 ||  || — || April 6, 2000 || Anderson Mesa || LONEOS || — || align=right | 3.7 km || 
|-id=684 bgcolor=#fefefe
| 104684 ||  || — || April 6, 2000 || Anderson Mesa || LONEOS || V || align=right | 1.5 km || 
|-id=685 bgcolor=#E9E9E9
| 104685 ||  || — || April 6, 2000 || Anderson Mesa || LONEOS || — || align=right | 3.7 km || 
|-id=686 bgcolor=#E9E9E9
| 104686 ||  || — || April 6, 2000 || Anderson Mesa || LONEOS || — || align=right | 2.0 km || 
|-id=687 bgcolor=#E9E9E9
| 104687 ||  || — || April 6, 2000 || Anderson Mesa || LONEOS || GEF || align=right | 2.4 km || 
|-id=688 bgcolor=#d6d6d6
| 104688 ||  || — || April 6, 2000 || Anderson Mesa || LONEOS || — || align=right | 6.9 km || 
|-id=689 bgcolor=#d6d6d6
| 104689 ||  || — || April 6, 2000 || Anderson Mesa || LONEOS || EOS || align=right | 4.0 km || 
|-id=690 bgcolor=#d6d6d6
| 104690 ||  || — || April 6, 2000 || Socorro || LINEAR || TEL || align=right | 2.6 km || 
|-id=691 bgcolor=#d6d6d6
| 104691 ||  || — || April 7, 2000 || Anderson Mesa || LONEOS || KOR || align=right | 3.4 km || 
|-id=692 bgcolor=#d6d6d6
| 104692 ||  || — || April 7, 2000 || Anderson Mesa || LONEOS || KOR || align=right | 3.3 km || 
|-id=693 bgcolor=#E9E9E9
| 104693 ||  || — || April 7, 2000 || Socorro || LINEAR || — || align=right | 3.1 km || 
|-id=694 bgcolor=#d6d6d6
| 104694 ||  || — || April 7, 2000 || Socorro || LINEAR || — || align=right | 5.5 km || 
|-id=695 bgcolor=#d6d6d6
| 104695 ||  || — || April 7, 2000 || Anderson Mesa || LONEOS || — || align=right | 7.3 km || 
|-id=696 bgcolor=#E9E9E9
| 104696 ||  || — || April 7, 2000 || Anderson Mesa || LONEOS || — || align=right | 2.1 km || 
|-id=697 bgcolor=#E9E9E9
| 104697 ||  || — || April 8, 2000 || Socorro || LINEAR || — || align=right | 2.0 km || 
|-id=698 bgcolor=#fefefe
| 104698 Alvindrew ||  ||  || April 10, 2000 || Kitt Peak || M. W. Buie || — || align=right | 1.2 km || 
|-id=699 bgcolor=#E9E9E9
| 104699 ||  || — || April 12, 2000 || Haleakala || NEAT || — || align=right | 2.4 km || 
|-id=700 bgcolor=#E9E9E9
| 104700 ||  || — || April 5, 2000 || Anderson Mesa || LONEOS || MAR || align=right | 3.7 km || 
|}

104701–104800 

|-bgcolor=#d6d6d6
| 104701 ||  || — || April 5, 2000 || Socorro || LINEAR || — || align=right | 4.2 km || 
|-id=702 bgcolor=#E9E9E9
| 104702 ||  || — || April 5, 2000 || Socorro || LINEAR || — || align=right | 1.7 km || 
|-id=703 bgcolor=#E9E9E9
| 104703 ||  || — || April 5, 2000 || Socorro || LINEAR || — || align=right | 5.1 km || 
|-id=704 bgcolor=#E9E9E9
| 104704 ||  || — || April 4, 2000 || Anderson Mesa || LONEOS || ADE || align=right | 5.0 km || 
|-id=705 bgcolor=#E9E9E9
| 104705 ||  || — || April 4, 2000 || Anderson Mesa || LONEOS || — || align=right | 4.3 km || 
|-id=706 bgcolor=#fefefe
| 104706 ||  || — || April 4, 2000 || Anderson Mesa || LONEOS || NYS || align=right | 1.3 km || 
|-id=707 bgcolor=#E9E9E9
| 104707 ||  || — || April 4, 2000 || Anderson Mesa || LONEOS || — || align=right | 1.7 km || 
|-id=708 bgcolor=#E9E9E9
| 104708 ||  || — || April 4, 2000 || Anderson Mesa || LONEOS || — || align=right | 4.0 km || 
|-id=709 bgcolor=#E9E9E9
| 104709 ||  || — || April 4, 2000 || Anderson Mesa || LONEOS || PAD || align=right | 3.9 km || 
|-id=710 bgcolor=#d6d6d6
| 104710 ||  || — || April 4, 2000 || Anderson Mesa || LONEOS || EOS || align=right | 4.7 km || 
|-id=711 bgcolor=#fefefe
| 104711 ||  || — || April 4, 2000 || Socorro || LINEAR || V || align=right | 1.5 km || 
|-id=712 bgcolor=#d6d6d6
| 104712 ||  || — || April 5, 2000 || Anderson Mesa || LONEOS || — || align=right | 6.2 km || 
|-id=713 bgcolor=#d6d6d6
| 104713 ||  || — || April 5, 2000 || Anderson Mesa || LONEOS || EOS || align=right | 3.8 km || 
|-id=714 bgcolor=#d6d6d6
| 104714 ||  || — || April 2, 2000 || Socorro || LINEAR || — || align=right | 8.1 km || 
|-id=715 bgcolor=#d6d6d6
| 104715 ||  || — || April 3, 2000 || Socorro || LINEAR || EOS || align=right | 4.1 km || 
|-id=716 bgcolor=#fefefe
| 104716 ||  || — || April 2, 2000 || Anderson Mesa || LONEOS || V || align=right | 1.5 km || 
|-id=717 bgcolor=#d6d6d6
| 104717 ||  || — || April 5, 2000 || Anderson Mesa || LONEOS || — || align=right | 6.1 km || 
|-id=718 bgcolor=#E9E9E9
| 104718 ||  || — || April 2, 2000 || Anderson Mesa || LONEOS || — || align=right | 5.3 km || 
|-id=719 bgcolor=#d6d6d6
| 104719 ||  || — || April 3, 2000 || Kitt Peak || Spacewatch || — || align=right | 4.7 km || 
|-id=720 bgcolor=#E9E9E9
| 104720 ||  || — || April 3, 2000 || Kitt Peak || Spacewatch || — || align=right | 2.1 km || 
|-id=721 bgcolor=#E9E9E9
| 104721 ||  || — || April 2, 2000 || Kitt Peak || Spacewatch || — || align=right | 2.7 km || 
|-id=722 bgcolor=#d6d6d6
| 104722 ||  || — || April 2, 2000 || Anderson Mesa || LONEOS || — || align=right | 5.9 km || 
|-id=723 bgcolor=#E9E9E9
| 104723 ||  || — || April 2, 2000 || Kitt Peak || Spacewatch || — || align=right | 2.7 km || 
|-id=724 bgcolor=#E9E9E9
| 104724 ||  || — || April 2, 2000 || Kitt Peak || Spacewatch || AST || align=right | 4.9 km || 
|-id=725 bgcolor=#d6d6d6
| 104725 ||  || — || April 3, 2000 || Kitt Peak || Spacewatch || KOR || align=right | 3.5 km || 
|-id=726 bgcolor=#E9E9E9
| 104726 ||  || — || April 4, 2000 || Anderson Mesa || LONEOS || — || align=right | 3.1 km || 
|-id=727 bgcolor=#fefefe
| 104727 ||  || — || April 4, 2000 || Socorro || LINEAR || — || align=right | 2.1 km || 
|-id=728 bgcolor=#d6d6d6
| 104728 ||  || — || April 5, 2000 || Anderson Mesa || LONEOS || — || align=right | 6.0 km || 
|-id=729 bgcolor=#E9E9E9
| 104729 ||  || — || April 5, 2000 || Anderson Mesa || LONEOS || — || align=right | 5.1 km || 
|-id=730 bgcolor=#fefefe
| 104730 || 2000 HQ || — || April 24, 2000 || Kitt Peak || Spacewatch || — || align=right | 3.5 km || 
|-id=731 bgcolor=#d6d6d6
| 104731 ||  || — || April 25, 2000 || Kitt Peak || Spacewatch || — || align=right | 4.8 km || 
|-id=732 bgcolor=#fefefe
| 104732 ||  || — || April 25, 2000 || Kitt Peak || Spacewatch || NYS || align=right | 1.3 km || 
|-id=733 bgcolor=#d6d6d6
| 104733 ||  || — || April 25, 2000 || Kitt Peak || Spacewatch || — || align=right | 4.8 km || 
|-id=734 bgcolor=#E9E9E9
| 104734 ||  || — || April 25, 2000 || Kitt Peak || Spacewatch || — || align=right | 2.3 km || 
|-id=735 bgcolor=#d6d6d6
| 104735 ||  || — || April 25, 2000 || Kitt Peak || Spacewatch || — || align=right | 3.1 km || 
|-id=736 bgcolor=#d6d6d6
| 104736 ||  || — || April 27, 2000 || Kitt Peak || Spacewatch || — || align=right | 6.4 km || 
|-id=737 bgcolor=#fefefe
| 104737 ||  || — || April 28, 2000 || Socorro || LINEAR || H || align=right data-sort-value="0.96" | 960 m || 
|-id=738 bgcolor=#d6d6d6
| 104738 ||  || — || April 27, 2000 || Socorro || LINEAR || — || align=right | 9.0 km || 
|-id=739 bgcolor=#E9E9E9
| 104739 ||  || — || April 27, 2000 || Socorro || LINEAR || — || align=right | 2.5 km || 
|-id=740 bgcolor=#E9E9E9
| 104740 ||  || — || April 27, 2000 || Socorro || LINEAR || — || align=right | 4.1 km || 
|-id=741 bgcolor=#fefefe
| 104741 ||  || — || April 27, 2000 || Socorro || LINEAR || — || align=right | 1.9 km || 
|-id=742 bgcolor=#d6d6d6
| 104742 ||  || — || April 27, 2000 || Socorro || LINEAR || 2:1J || align=right | 5.0 km || 
|-id=743 bgcolor=#E9E9E9
| 104743 ||  || — || April 27, 2000 || Socorro || LINEAR || — || align=right | 2.9 km || 
|-id=744 bgcolor=#E9E9E9
| 104744 ||  || — || April 27, 2000 || Socorro || LINEAR || EUN || align=right | 2.7 km || 
|-id=745 bgcolor=#d6d6d6
| 104745 ||  || — || April 28, 2000 || Socorro || LINEAR || — || align=right | 5.1 km || 
|-id=746 bgcolor=#E9E9E9
| 104746 ||  || — || April 28, 2000 || Socorro || LINEAR || — || align=right | 2.3 km || 
|-id=747 bgcolor=#fefefe
| 104747 ||  || — || April 28, 2000 || Socorro || LINEAR || NYS || align=right | 1.2 km || 
|-id=748 bgcolor=#d6d6d6
| 104748 ||  || — || April 28, 2000 || Socorro || LINEAR || — || align=right | 4.2 km || 
|-id=749 bgcolor=#fefefe
| 104749 ||  || — || April 28, 2000 || Socorro || LINEAR || NYS || align=right | 1.7 km || 
|-id=750 bgcolor=#E9E9E9
| 104750 ||  || — || April 28, 2000 || Socorro || LINEAR || — || align=right | 3.1 km || 
|-id=751 bgcolor=#d6d6d6
| 104751 ||  || — || April 28, 2000 || Socorro || LINEAR || — || align=right | 4.5 km || 
|-id=752 bgcolor=#d6d6d6
| 104752 ||  || — || April 28, 2000 || Socorro || LINEAR || HYG || align=right | 4.3 km || 
|-id=753 bgcolor=#fefefe
| 104753 ||  || — || April 27, 2000 || Socorro || LINEAR || — || align=right | 2.0 km || 
|-id=754 bgcolor=#d6d6d6
| 104754 ||  || — || April 27, 2000 || Socorro || LINEAR || — || align=right | 5.9 km || 
|-id=755 bgcolor=#d6d6d6
| 104755 ||  || — || April 27, 2000 || Socorro || LINEAR || — || align=right | 4.9 km || 
|-id=756 bgcolor=#E9E9E9
| 104756 ||  || — || April 29, 2000 || Socorro || LINEAR || — || align=right | 1.9 km || 
|-id=757 bgcolor=#fefefe
| 104757 ||  || — || April 29, 2000 || Socorro || LINEAR || MAS || align=right | 1.5 km || 
|-id=758 bgcolor=#d6d6d6
| 104758 ||  || — || April 25, 2000 || Kitt Peak || Spacewatch || KOR || align=right | 3.1 km || 
|-id=759 bgcolor=#E9E9E9
| 104759 ||  || — || April 25, 2000 || Kitt Peak || Spacewatch || — || align=right | 5.1 km || 
|-id=760 bgcolor=#d6d6d6
| 104760 ||  || — || April 25, 2000 || Kitt Peak || Spacewatch || — || align=right | 6.3 km || 
|-id=761 bgcolor=#E9E9E9
| 104761 ||  || — || April 29, 2000 || Socorro || LINEAR || — || align=right | 2.4 km || 
|-id=762 bgcolor=#d6d6d6
| 104762 ||  || — || April 29, 2000 || Socorro || LINEAR || EOS || align=right | 3.9 km || 
|-id=763 bgcolor=#fefefe
| 104763 ||  || — || April 29, 2000 || Socorro || LINEAR || — || align=right | 1.9 km || 
|-id=764 bgcolor=#d6d6d6
| 104764 ||  || — || April 30, 2000 || Socorro || LINEAR || EOS || align=right | 4.1 km || 
|-id=765 bgcolor=#fefefe
| 104765 ||  || — || April 30, 2000 || Socorro || LINEAR || — || align=right | 2.1 km || 
|-id=766 bgcolor=#E9E9E9
| 104766 ||  || — || April 29, 2000 || Tebbutt || F. B. Zoltowski || — || align=right | 4.1 km || 
|-id=767 bgcolor=#E9E9E9
| 104767 ||  || — || April 24, 2000 || Anderson Mesa || LONEOS || MAR || align=right | 1.9 km || 
|-id=768 bgcolor=#E9E9E9
| 104768 ||  || — || April 24, 2000 || Anderson Mesa || LONEOS || — || align=right | 4.0 km || 
|-id=769 bgcolor=#d6d6d6
| 104769 ||  || — || April 24, 2000 || Anderson Mesa || LONEOS || KOR || align=right | 2.9 km || 
|-id=770 bgcolor=#fefefe
| 104770 ||  || — || April 28, 2000 || Socorro || LINEAR || H || align=right | 1.4 km || 
|-id=771 bgcolor=#E9E9E9
| 104771 ||  || — || April 29, 2000 || Socorro || LINEAR || TIN || align=right | 2.9 km || 
|-id=772 bgcolor=#fefefe
| 104772 ||  || — || April 29, 2000 || Socorro || LINEAR || — || align=right | 3.3 km || 
|-id=773 bgcolor=#E9E9E9
| 104773 ||  || — || April 27, 2000 || Socorro || LINEAR || RAF || align=right | 1.8 km || 
|-id=774 bgcolor=#d6d6d6
| 104774 ||  || — || April 28, 2000 || Socorro || LINEAR || — || align=right | 4.0 km || 
|-id=775 bgcolor=#d6d6d6
| 104775 ||  || — || April 28, 2000 || Socorro || LINEAR || — || align=right | 7.4 km || 
|-id=776 bgcolor=#fefefe
| 104776 ||  || — || April 28, 2000 || Socorro || LINEAR || — || align=right | 3.8 km || 
|-id=777 bgcolor=#E9E9E9
| 104777 ||  || — || April 28, 2000 || Socorro || LINEAR || — || align=right | 4.6 km || 
|-id=778 bgcolor=#E9E9E9
| 104778 ||  || — || April 28, 2000 || Socorro || LINEAR || JUN || align=right | 2.2 km || 
|-id=779 bgcolor=#E9E9E9
| 104779 ||  || — || April 29, 2000 || Socorro || LINEAR || — || align=right | 3.6 km || 
|-id=780 bgcolor=#d6d6d6
| 104780 ||  || — || April 29, 2000 || Socorro || LINEAR || THM || align=right | 5.0 km || 
|-id=781 bgcolor=#d6d6d6
| 104781 ||  || — || April 29, 2000 || Socorro || LINEAR || NAE || align=right | 6.6 km || 
|-id=782 bgcolor=#E9E9E9
| 104782 ||  || — || April 29, 2000 || Socorro || LINEAR || — || align=right | 2.7 km || 
|-id=783 bgcolor=#E9E9E9
| 104783 ||  || — || April 29, 2000 || Socorro || LINEAR || — || align=right | 4.0 km || 
|-id=784 bgcolor=#E9E9E9
| 104784 ||  || — || April 29, 2000 || Socorro || LINEAR || HNS || align=right | 3.2 km || 
|-id=785 bgcolor=#d6d6d6
| 104785 ||  || — || April 29, 2000 || Socorro || LINEAR || AEG || align=right | 6.7 km || 
|-id=786 bgcolor=#d6d6d6
| 104786 ||  || — || April 27, 2000 || Socorro || LINEAR || — || align=right | 7.1 km || 
|-id=787 bgcolor=#d6d6d6
| 104787 ||  || — || April 28, 2000 || Socorro || LINEAR || — || align=right | 7.3 km || 
|-id=788 bgcolor=#E9E9E9
| 104788 ||  || — || April 28, 2000 || Socorro || LINEAR || — || align=right | 3.3 km || 
|-id=789 bgcolor=#E9E9E9
| 104789 ||  || — || April 28, 2000 || Socorro || LINEAR || — || align=right | 3.3 km || 
|-id=790 bgcolor=#E9E9E9
| 104790 ||  || — || April 28, 2000 || Socorro || LINEAR || — || align=right | 3.5 km || 
|-id=791 bgcolor=#E9E9E9
| 104791 ||  || — || April 28, 2000 || Socorro || LINEAR || — || align=right | 3.1 km || 
|-id=792 bgcolor=#d6d6d6
| 104792 ||  || — || April 28, 2000 || Socorro || LINEAR || — || align=right | 6.3 km || 
|-id=793 bgcolor=#fefefe
| 104793 ||  || — || April 28, 2000 || Kitt Peak || Spacewatch || V || align=right | 1.7 km || 
|-id=794 bgcolor=#d6d6d6
| 104794 ||  || — || April 28, 2000 || Kitt Peak || Spacewatch || — || align=right | 5.9 km || 
|-id=795 bgcolor=#d6d6d6
| 104795 ||  || — || April 29, 2000 || Kitt Peak || Spacewatch || HYG || align=right | 6.5 km || 
|-id=796 bgcolor=#E9E9E9
| 104796 ||  || — || April 28, 2000 || Socorro || LINEAR || — || align=right | 3.4 km || 
|-id=797 bgcolor=#E9E9E9
| 104797 ||  || — || April 28, 2000 || Socorro || LINEAR || — || align=right | 3.8 km || 
|-id=798 bgcolor=#d6d6d6
| 104798 ||  || — || April 28, 2000 || Socorro || LINEAR || — || align=right | 6.1 km || 
|-id=799 bgcolor=#E9E9E9
| 104799 ||  || — || April 28, 2000 || Anderson Mesa || LONEOS || — || align=right | 2.7 km || 
|-id=800 bgcolor=#E9E9E9
| 104800 ||  || — || April 29, 2000 || Socorro || LINEAR || — || align=right | 2.5 km || 
|}

104801–104900 

|-bgcolor=#E9E9E9
| 104801 ||  || — || April 29, 2000 || Socorro || LINEAR || JUN || align=right | 1.8 km || 
|-id=802 bgcolor=#fefefe
| 104802 ||  || — || April 29, 2000 || Socorro || LINEAR || — || align=right | 2.1 km || 
|-id=803 bgcolor=#fefefe
| 104803 ||  || — || April 29, 2000 || Socorro || LINEAR || NYS || align=right | 1.6 km || 
|-id=804 bgcolor=#d6d6d6
| 104804 ||  || — || April 29, 2000 || Kitt Peak || Spacewatch || — || align=right | 4.0 km || 
|-id=805 bgcolor=#d6d6d6
| 104805 ||  || — || April 29, 2000 || Kitt Peak || Spacewatch || — || align=right | 5.0 km || 
|-id=806 bgcolor=#d6d6d6
| 104806 ||  || — || April 26, 2000 || Anderson Mesa || LONEOS || TIR || align=right | 4.5 km || 
|-id=807 bgcolor=#E9E9E9
| 104807 ||  || — || April 26, 2000 || Anderson Mesa || LONEOS || — || align=right | 2.7 km || 
|-id=808 bgcolor=#d6d6d6
| 104808 ||  || — || April 29, 2000 || Socorro || LINEAR || — || align=right | 4.2 km || 
|-id=809 bgcolor=#d6d6d6
| 104809 ||  || — || April 29, 2000 || Socorro || LINEAR || — || align=right | 6.2 km || 
|-id=810 bgcolor=#d6d6d6
| 104810 ||  || — || April 29, 2000 || Socorro || LINEAR || THM || align=right | 4.2 km || 
|-id=811 bgcolor=#fefefe
| 104811 ||  || — || April 29, 2000 || Socorro || LINEAR || — || align=right | 1.6 km || 
|-id=812 bgcolor=#d6d6d6
| 104812 ||  || — || April 29, 2000 || Socorro || LINEAR || — || align=right | 5.0 km || 
|-id=813 bgcolor=#d6d6d6
| 104813 ||  || — || April 29, 2000 || Socorro || LINEAR || — || align=right | 6.7 km || 
|-id=814 bgcolor=#E9E9E9
| 104814 ||  || — || April 29, 2000 || Socorro || LINEAR || — || align=right | 1.9 km || 
|-id=815 bgcolor=#E9E9E9
| 104815 ||  || — || April 29, 2000 || Socorro || LINEAR || MIS || align=right | 4.8 km || 
|-id=816 bgcolor=#d6d6d6
| 104816 ||  || — || April 29, 2000 || Socorro || LINEAR || — || align=right | 5.6 km || 
|-id=817 bgcolor=#fefefe
| 104817 ||  || — || April 29, 2000 || Socorro || LINEAR || NYS || align=right | 1.5 km || 
|-id=818 bgcolor=#fefefe
| 104818 ||  || — || April 29, 2000 || Socorro || LINEAR || — || align=right | 2.6 km || 
|-id=819 bgcolor=#d6d6d6
| 104819 ||  || — || April 29, 2000 || Socorro || LINEAR || THM || align=right | 4.2 km || 
|-id=820 bgcolor=#d6d6d6
| 104820 ||  || — || April 24, 2000 || Anderson Mesa || LONEOS || — || align=right | 5.9 km || 
|-id=821 bgcolor=#fefefe
| 104821 ||  || — || April 24, 2000 || Anderson Mesa || LONEOS || NYS || align=right | 2.0 km || 
|-id=822 bgcolor=#fefefe
| 104822 ||  || — || April 24, 2000 || Anderson Mesa || LONEOS || V || align=right | 1.3 km || 
|-id=823 bgcolor=#E9E9E9
| 104823 ||  || — || April 24, 2000 || Anderson Mesa || LONEOS || — || align=right | 3.7 km || 
|-id=824 bgcolor=#d6d6d6
| 104824 ||  || — || April 24, 2000 || Anderson Mesa || LONEOS || ANF || align=right | 3.1 km || 
|-id=825 bgcolor=#d6d6d6
| 104825 ||  || — || April 24, 2000 || Kitt Peak || Spacewatch || — || align=right | 4.0 km || 
|-id=826 bgcolor=#fefefe
| 104826 ||  || — || April 25, 2000 || Kitt Peak || Spacewatch || FLO || align=right | 1.7 km || 
|-id=827 bgcolor=#d6d6d6
| 104827 ||  || — || April 25, 2000 || Anderson Mesa || LONEOS || EOS || align=right | 4.8 km || 
|-id=828 bgcolor=#d6d6d6
| 104828 ||  || — || April 25, 2000 || Anderson Mesa || LONEOS || — || align=right | 5.2 km || 
|-id=829 bgcolor=#d6d6d6
| 104829 ||  || — || April 26, 2000 || Anderson Mesa || LONEOS || — || align=right | 7.1 km || 
|-id=830 bgcolor=#E9E9E9
| 104830 ||  || — || April 26, 2000 || Anderson Mesa || LONEOS || — || align=right | 1.6 km || 
|-id=831 bgcolor=#E9E9E9
| 104831 ||  || — || April 26, 2000 || Anderson Mesa || LONEOS || RAF || align=right | 1.8 km || 
|-id=832 bgcolor=#E9E9E9
| 104832 ||  || — || April 26, 2000 || Anderson Mesa || LONEOS || EUN || align=right | 2.7 km || 
|-id=833 bgcolor=#d6d6d6
| 104833 ||  || — || April 26, 2000 || Anderson Mesa || LONEOS || HYG || align=right | 6.4 km || 
|-id=834 bgcolor=#d6d6d6
| 104834 ||  || — || April 27, 2000 || Kitt Peak || Spacewatch || — || align=right | 4.5 km || 
|-id=835 bgcolor=#fefefe
| 104835 ||  || — || April 28, 2000 || Kitt Peak || Spacewatch || NYS || align=right | 1.4 km || 
|-id=836 bgcolor=#d6d6d6
| 104836 ||  || — || April 26, 2000 || Anderson Mesa || LONEOS || — || align=right | 7.5 km || 
|-id=837 bgcolor=#d6d6d6
| 104837 ||  || — || April 26, 2000 || Anderson Mesa || LONEOS || — || align=right | 6.4 km || 
|-id=838 bgcolor=#E9E9E9
| 104838 ||  || — || April 26, 2000 || Anderson Mesa || LONEOS || — || align=right | 2.4 km || 
|-id=839 bgcolor=#d6d6d6
| 104839 ||  || — || April 30, 2000 || Anderson Mesa || LONEOS || — || align=right | 7.3 km || 
|-id=840 bgcolor=#d6d6d6
| 104840 ||  || — || April 24, 2000 || Anderson Mesa || LONEOS || — || align=right | 4.8 km || 
|-id=841 bgcolor=#d6d6d6
| 104841 ||  || — || April 24, 2000 || Anderson Mesa || LONEOS || — || align=right | 3.9 km || 
|-id=842 bgcolor=#d6d6d6
| 104842 ||  || — || April 25, 2000 || Anderson Mesa || LONEOS || — || align=right | 3.5 km || 
|-id=843 bgcolor=#E9E9E9
| 104843 ||  || — || April 25, 2000 || Anderson Mesa || LONEOS || — || align=right | 1.4 km || 
|-id=844 bgcolor=#E9E9E9
| 104844 ||  || — || April 25, 2000 || Anderson Mesa || LONEOS || EUN || align=right | 1.7 km || 
|-id=845 bgcolor=#E9E9E9
| 104845 ||  || — || April 27, 2000 || Anderson Mesa || LONEOS || — || align=right | 2.0 km || 
|-id=846 bgcolor=#E9E9E9
| 104846 ||  || — || April 27, 2000 || Anderson Mesa || LONEOS || — || align=right | 2.6 km || 
|-id=847 bgcolor=#d6d6d6
| 104847 ||  || — || April 27, 2000 || Anderson Mesa || LONEOS || — || align=right | 3.1 km || 
|-id=848 bgcolor=#E9E9E9
| 104848 ||  || — || April 30, 2000 || Haleakala || NEAT || — || align=right | 3.8 km || 
|-id=849 bgcolor=#E9E9E9
| 104849 ||  || — || April 27, 2000 || Kitt Peak || Spacewatch || — || align=right | 2.3 km || 
|-id=850 bgcolor=#E9E9E9
| 104850 ||  || — || April 27, 2000 || Socorro || LINEAR || — || align=right | 2.0 km || 
|-id=851 bgcolor=#d6d6d6
| 104851 ||  || — || April 27, 2000 || Socorro || LINEAR || VER || align=right | 9.1 km || 
|-id=852 bgcolor=#E9E9E9
| 104852 ||  || — || April 27, 2000 || Socorro || LINEAR || — || align=right | 2.1 km || 
|-id=853 bgcolor=#d6d6d6
| 104853 ||  || — || April 27, 2000 || Socorro || LINEAR || HYG || align=right | 5.7 km || 
|-id=854 bgcolor=#d6d6d6
| 104854 ||  || — || April 27, 2000 || Socorro || LINEAR || — || align=right | 3.5 km || 
|-id=855 bgcolor=#d6d6d6
| 104855 ||  || — || April 27, 2000 || Socorro || LINEAR || — || align=right | 5.4 km || 
|-id=856 bgcolor=#E9E9E9
| 104856 ||  || — || April 28, 2000 || Anderson Mesa || LONEOS || EUN || align=right | 2.4 km || 
|-id=857 bgcolor=#d6d6d6
| 104857 ||  || — || April 28, 2000 || Socorro || LINEAR || — || align=right | 4.7 km || 
|-id=858 bgcolor=#d6d6d6
| 104858 ||  || — || April 28, 2000 || Socorro || LINEAR || — || align=right | 7.7 km || 
|-id=859 bgcolor=#d6d6d6
| 104859 ||  || — || April 28, 2000 || Anderson Mesa || LONEOS || TIR || align=right | 5.9 km || 
|-id=860 bgcolor=#E9E9E9
| 104860 ||  || — || April 28, 2000 || Anderson Mesa || LONEOS || — || align=right | 2.0 km || 
|-id=861 bgcolor=#E9E9E9
| 104861 ||  || — || April 28, 2000 || Anderson Mesa || LONEOS || — || align=right | 3.3 km || 
|-id=862 bgcolor=#d6d6d6
| 104862 ||  || — || April 28, 2000 || Anderson Mesa || LONEOS || BRA || align=right | 2.7 km || 
|-id=863 bgcolor=#fefefe
| 104863 ||  || — || April 29, 2000 || Socorro || LINEAR || FLO || align=right | 1.0 km || 
|-id=864 bgcolor=#E9E9E9
| 104864 ||  || — || April 29, 2000 || Socorro || LINEAR || — || align=right | 2.2 km || 
|-id=865 bgcolor=#E9E9E9
| 104865 ||  || — || April 30, 2000 || Anderson Mesa || LONEOS || — || align=right | 1.9 km || 
|-id=866 bgcolor=#d6d6d6
| 104866 ||  || — || April 30, 2000 || Anderson Mesa || LONEOS || — || align=right | 9.5 km || 
|-id=867 bgcolor=#E9E9E9
| 104867 ||  || — || April 30, 2000 || Kitt Peak || Spacewatch || — || align=right | 4.1 km || 
|-id=868 bgcolor=#E9E9E9
| 104868 ||  || — || April 27, 2000 || Socorro || LINEAR || — || align=right | 4.0 km || 
|-id=869 bgcolor=#fefefe
| 104869 ||  || — || April 29, 2000 || Socorro || LINEAR || MAS || align=right | 1.4 km || 
|-id=870 bgcolor=#d6d6d6
| 104870 ||  || — || April 29, 2000 || Socorro || LINEAR || — || align=right | 5.5 km || 
|-id=871 bgcolor=#fefefe
| 104871 ||  || — || April 27, 2000 || Anderson Mesa || LONEOS || — || align=right | 1.9 km || 
|-id=872 bgcolor=#d6d6d6
| 104872 ||  || — || April 27, 2000 || Socorro || LINEAR || — || align=right | 6.3 km || 
|-id=873 bgcolor=#fefefe
| 104873 ||  || — || April 27, 2000 || Socorro || LINEAR || V || align=right | 1.4 km || 
|-id=874 bgcolor=#d6d6d6
| 104874 ||  || — || April 27, 2000 || Socorro || LINEAR || — || align=right | 3.7 km || 
|-id=875 bgcolor=#fefefe
| 104875 ||  || — || April 26, 2000 || Kitt Peak || Spacewatch || MAS || align=right | 1.6 km || 
|-id=876 bgcolor=#d6d6d6
| 104876 ||  || — || April 27, 2000 || Kitt Peak || Spacewatch || 3:2 || align=right | 7.3 km || 
|-id=877 bgcolor=#d6d6d6
| 104877 ||  || — || April 27, 2000 || Anderson Mesa || LONEOS || — || align=right | 5.2 km || 
|-id=878 bgcolor=#d6d6d6
| 104878 ||  || — || April 24, 2000 || Anderson Mesa || LONEOS || — || align=right | 3.0 km || 
|-id=879 bgcolor=#E9E9E9
| 104879 ||  || — || April 25, 2000 || Kitt Peak || Spacewatch || — || align=right | 5.1 km || 
|-id=880 bgcolor=#E9E9E9
| 104880 ||  || — || April 26, 2000 || Anderson Mesa || LONEOS || — || align=right | 5.9 km || 
|-id=881 bgcolor=#E9E9E9
| 104881 ||  || — || April 27, 2000 || Anderson Mesa || LONEOS || — || align=right | 2.7 km || 
|-id=882 bgcolor=#d6d6d6
| 104882 ||  || — || April 27, 2000 || Anderson Mesa || LONEOS || — || align=right | 9.4 km || 
|-id=883 bgcolor=#E9E9E9
| 104883 ||  || — || April 27, 2000 || Anderson Mesa || LONEOS || — || align=right | 2.9 km || 
|-id=884 bgcolor=#E9E9E9
| 104884 ||  || — || April 27, 2000 || Anderson Mesa || LONEOS || — || align=right | 2.2 km || 
|-id=885 bgcolor=#E9E9E9
| 104885 ||  || — || April 27, 2000 || Anderson Mesa || LONEOS || MAR || align=right | 2.3 km || 
|-id=886 bgcolor=#fefefe
| 104886 || 2000 JS || — || May 1, 2000 || Socorro || LINEAR || NYS || align=right | 1.2 km || 
|-id=887 bgcolor=#fefefe
| 104887 ||  || — || May 2, 2000 || Socorro || LINEAR || H || align=right | 1.3 km || 
|-id=888 bgcolor=#d6d6d6
| 104888 ||  || — || May 1, 2000 || Socorro || LINEAR || — || align=right | 5.4 km || 
|-id=889 bgcolor=#d6d6d6
| 104889 ||  || — || May 1, 2000 || Socorro || LINEAR || KOR || align=right | 2.9 km || 
|-id=890 bgcolor=#fefefe
| 104890 ||  || — || May 1, 2000 || Socorro || LINEAR || PHO || align=right | 2.5 km || 
|-id=891 bgcolor=#d6d6d6
| 104891 ||  || — || May 2, 2000 || Socorro || LINEAR || — || align=right | 6.4 km || 
|-id=892 bgcolor=#d6d6d6
| 104892 ||  || — || May 2, 2000 || Socorro || LINEAR || — || align=right | 3.9 km || 
|-id=893 bgcolor=#fefefe
| 104893 ||  || — || May 3, 2000 || Socorro || LINEAR || H || align=right | 1.1 km || 
|-id=894 bgcolor=#fefefe
| 104894 ||  || — || May 3, 2000 || Socorro || LINEAR || H || align=right | 1.4 km || 
|-id=895 bgcolor=#d6d6d6
| 104895 ||  || — || May 2, 2000 || Kitt Peak || Spacewatch || 628 || align=right | 6.4 km || 
|-id=896 bgcolor=#d6d6d6
| 104896 Schwanden ||  ||  || May 2, 2000 || Drebach || J. Kandler || — || align=right | 3.5 km || 
|-id=897 bgcolor=#E9E9E9
| 104897 ||  || — || May 5, 2000 || Farpoint || Farpoint Obs. || — || align=right | 2.9 km || 
|-id=898 bgcolor=#d6d6d6
| 104898 ||  || — || May 2, 2000 || Socorro || LINEAR || PALTj (2.98) || align=right | 6.8 km || 
|-id=899 bgcolor=#E9E9E9
| 104899 ||  || — || May 4, 2000 || Socorro || LINEAR || ADE || align=right | 3.4 km || 
|-id=900 bgcolor=#d6d6d6
| 104900 ||  || — || May 1, 2000 || Kitt Peak || Spacewatch || THM || align=right | 5.8 km || 
|}

104901–105000 

|-bgcolor=#d6d6d6
| 104901 ||  || — || May 1, 2000 || Kitt Peak || Spacewatch || THM || align=right | 5.1 km || 
|-id=902 bgcolor=#fefefe
| 104902 ||  || — || May 6, 2000 || Socorro || LINEAR || H || align=right | 1.3 km || 
|-id=903 bgcolor=#d6d6d6
| 104903 ||  || — || May 3, 2000 || Socorro || LINEAR || TIR || align=right | 4.2 km || 
|-id=904 bgcolor=#E9E9E9
| 104904 ||  || — || May 3, 2000 || Socorro || LINEAR || — || align=right | 2.4 km || 
|-id=905 bgcolor=#E9E9E9
| 104905 ||  || — || May 4, 2000 || Socorro || LINEAR || — || align=right | 5.1 km || 
|-id=906 bgcolor=#fefefe
| 104906 ||  || — || May 7, 2000 || Socorro || LINEAR || PHO || align=right | 6.4 km || 
|-id=907 bgcolor=#d6d6d6
| 104907 ||  || — || May 3, 2000 || Socorro || LINEAR || — || align=right | 4.5 km || 
|-id=908 bgcolor=#d6d6d6
| 104908 ||  || — || May 3, 2000 || Socorro || LINEAR || — || align=right | 5.8 km || 
|-id=909 bgcolor=#d6d6d6
| 104909 ||  || — || May 6, 2000 || Socorro || LINEAR || — || align=right | 5.0 km || 
|-id=910 bgcolor=#E9E9E9
| 104910 ||  || — || May 9, 2000 || Socorro || LINEAR || EUN || align=right | 2.4 km || 
|-id=911 bgcolor=#d6d6d6
| 104911 ||  || — || May 6, 2000 || Socorro || LINEAR || — || align=right | 4.6 km || 
|-id=912 bgcolor=#E9E9E9
| 104912 ||  || — || May 9, 2000 || Socorro || LINEAR || — || align=right | 6.3 km || 
|-id=913 bgcolor=#E9E9E9
| 104913 ||  || — || May 9, 2000 || Prescott || P. G. Comba || — || align=right | 4.0 km || 
|-id=914 bgcolor=#d6d6d6
| 104914 ||  || — || May 5, 2000 || Socorro || LINEAR || — || align=right | 6.1 km || 
|-id=915 bgcolor=#d6d6d6
| 104915 ||  || — || May 6, 2000 || Socorro || LINEAR || — || align=right | 7.4 km || 
|-id=916 bgcolor=#d6d6d6
| 104916 ||  || — || May 5, 2000 || Socorro || LINEAR || — || align=right | 3.7 km || 
|-id=917 bgcolor=#fefefe
| 104917 ||  || — || May 6, 2000 || Socorro || LINEAR || — || align=right | 2.1 km || 
|-id=918 bgcolor=#fefefe
| 104918 ||  || — || May 6, 2000 || Socorro || LINEAR || — || align=right | 1.9 km || 
|-id=919 bgcolor=#E9E9E9
| 104919 ||  || — || May 6, 2000 || Socorro || LINEAR || CLO || align=right | 3.1 km || 
|-id=920 bgcolor=#E9E9E9
| 104920 ||  || — || May 3, 2000 || Socorro || LINEAR || — || align=right | 3.2 km || 
|-id=921 bgcolor=#d6d6d6
| 104921 ||  || — || May 3, 2000 || Socorro || LINEAR || — || align=right | 8.8 km || 
|-id=922 bgcolor=#fefefe
| 104922 ||  || — || May 3, 2000 || Socorro || LINEAR || PHO || align=right | 3.0 km || 
|-id=923 bgcolor=#E9E9E9
| 104923 ||  || — || May 6, 2000 || Socorro || LINEAR || — || align=right | 1.9 km || 
|-id=924 bgcolor=#d6d6d6
| 104924 ||  || — || May 6, 2000 || Socorro || LINEAR || — || align=right | 4.8 km || 
|-id=925 bgcolor=#E9E9E9
| 104925 ||  || — || May 6, 2000 || Socorro || LINEAR || — || align=right | 1.8 km || 
|-id=926 bgcolor=#E9E9E9
| 104926 ||  || — || May 7, 2000 || Socorro || LINEAR || EUN || align=right | 2.5 km || 
|-id=927 bgcolor=#E9E9E9
| 104927 ||  || — || May 7, 2000 || Socorro || LINEAR || — || align=right | 2.5 km || 
|-id=928 bgcolor=#d6d6d6
| 104928 ||  || — || May 7, 2000 || Socorro || LINEAR || EOS || align=right | 3.1 km || 
|-id=929 bgcolor=#d6d6d6
| 104929 ||  || — || May 7, 2000 || Socorro || LINEAR || THM || align=right | 3.6 km || 
|-id=930 bgcolor=#E9E9E9
| 104930 ||  || — || May 7, 2000 || Socorro || LINEAR || — || align=right | 3.2 km || 
|-id=931 bgcolor=#E9E9E9
| 104931 ||  || — || May 7, 2000 || Socorro || LINEAR || — || align=right | 1.9 km || 
|-id=932 bgcolor=#E9E9E9
| 104932 ||  || — || May 7, 2000 || Socorro || LINEAR || CLO || align=right | 4.1 km || 
|-id=933 bgcolor=#E9E9E9
| 104933 ||  || — || May 7, 2000 || Socorro || LINEAR || — || align=right | 2.1 km || 
|-id=934 bgcolor=#fefefe
| 104934 ||  || — || May 7, 2000 || Socorro || LINEAR || NYS || align=right | 1.7 km || 
|-id=935 bgcolor=#fefefe
| 104935 ||  || — || May 7, 2000 || Socorro || LINEAR || — || align=right | 1.2 km || 
|-id=936 bgcolor=#E9E9E9
| 104936 ||  || — || May 7, 2000 || Socorro || LINEAR || — || align=right | 4.7 km || 
|-id=937 bgcolor=#E9E9E9
| 104937 ||  || — || May 7, 2000 || Socorro || LINEAR || EUN || align=right | 2.5 km || 
|-id=938 bgcolor=#fefefe
| 104938 ||  || — || May 7, 2000 || Socorro || LINEAR || — || align=right | 2.0 km || 
|-id=939 bgcolor=#d6d6d6
| 104939 ||  || — || May 7, 2000 || Socorro || LINEAR || — || align=right | 5.1 km || 
|-id=940 bgcolor=#E9E9E9
| 104940 ||  || — || May 7, 2000 || Socorro || LINEAR || — || align=right | 2.3 km || 
|-id=941 bgcolor=#E9E9E9
| 104941 ||  || — || May 7, 2000 || Socorro || LINEAR || — || align=right | 2.6 km || 
|-id=942 bgcolor=#d6d6d6
| 104942 ||  || — || May 7, 2000 || Socorro || LINEAR || — || align=right | 9.2 km || 
|-id=943 bgcolor=#d6d6d6
| 104943 ||  || — || May 5, 2000 || Socorro || LINEAR || HIL3:2 || align=right | 14 km || 
|-id=944 bgcolor=#d6d6d6
| 104944 ||  || — || May 7, 2000 || Socorro || LINEAR || TEL || align=right | 2.9 km || 
|-id=945 bgcolor=#d6d6d6
| 104945 ||  || — || May 7, 2000 || Socorro || LINEAR || THM || align=right | 6.5 km || 
|-id=946 bgcolor=#fefefe
| 104946 ||  || — || May 7, 2000 || Socorro || LINEAR || — || align=right | 1.4 km || 
|-id=947 bgcolor=#E9E9E9
| 104947 ||  || — || May 7, 2000 || Socorro || LINEAR || — || align=right | 3.0 km || 
|-id=948 bgcolor=#d6d6d6
| 104948 ||  || — || May 7, 2000 || Socorro || LINEAR || — || align=right | 4.4 km || 
|-id=949 bgcolor=#d6d6d6
| 104949 ||  || — || May 7, 2000 || Socorro || LINEAR || — || align=right | 4.1 km || 
|-id=950 bgcolor=#d6d6d6
| 104950 ||  || — || May 7, 2000 || Socorro || LINEAR || MEL || align=right | 5.6 km || 
|-id=951 bgcolor=#d6d6d6
| 104951 ||  || — || May 7, 2000 || Socorro || LINEAR || THM || align=right | 3.4 km || 
|-id=952 bgcolor=#d6d6d6
| 104952 ||  || — || May 7, 2000 || Socorro || LINEAR || THM || align=right | 6.9 km || 
|-id=953 bgcolor=#d6d6d6
| 104953 ||  || — || May 7, 2000 || Socorro || LINEAR || — || align=right | 5.5 km || 
|-id=954 bgcolor=#d6d6d6
| 104954 ||  || — || May 9, 2000 || Socorro || LINEAR || — || align=right | 9.6 km || 
|-id=955 bgcolor=#E9E9E9
| 104955 ||  || — || May 9, 2000 || Socorro || LINEAR || ADE || align=right | 4.5 km || 
|-id=956 bgcolor=#d6d6d6
| 104956 ||  || — || May 9, 2000 || Socorro || LINEAR || — || align=right | 7.6 km || 
|-id=957 bgcolor=#d6d6d6
| 104957 ||  || — || May 9, 2000 || Socorro || LINEAR || — || align=right | 8.6 km || 
|-id=958 bgcolor=#d6d6d6
| 104958 ||  || — || May 9, 2000 || Socorro || LINEAR || — || align=right | 4.7 km || 
|-id=959 bgcolor=#d6d6d6
| 104959 ||  || — || May 9, 2000 || Socorro || LINEAR || ALA || align=right | 7.6 km || 
|-id=960 bgcolor=#d6d6d6
| 104960 ||  || — || May 9, 2000 || Socorro || LINEAR || HYG || align=right | 6.2 km || 
|-id=961 bgcolor=#E9E9E9
| 104961 ||  || — || May 9, 2000 || Socorro || LINEAR || — || align=right | 2.0 km || 
|-id=962 bgcolor=#E9E9E9
| 104962 ||  || — || May 9, 2000 || Socorro || LINEAR || — || align=right | 3.4 km || 
|-id=963 bgcolor=#E9E9E9
| 104963 ||  || — || May 6, 2000 || Socorro || LINEAR || — || align=right | 4.0 km || 
|-id=964 bgcolor=#d6d6d6
| 104964 ||  || — || May 6, 2000 || Socorro || LINEAR || — || align=right | 4.9 km || 
|-id=965 bgcolor=#E9E9E9
| 104965 ||  || — || May 6, 2000 || Socorro || LINEAR || — || align=right | 2.5 km || 
|-id=966 bgcolor=#E9E9E9
| 104966 ||  || — || May 6, 2000 || Socorro || LINEAR || EUN || align=right | 3.5 km || 
|-id=967 bgcolor=#d6d6d6
| 104967 ||  || — || May 6, 2000 || Socorro || LINEAR || TIR || align=right | 4.0 km || 
|-id=968 bgcolor=#E9E9E9
| 104968 ||  || — || May 6, 2000 || Socorro || LINEAR || DOR || align=right | 4.8 km || 
|-id=969 bgcolor=#E9E9E9
| 104969 ||  || — || May 7, 2000 || Socorro || LINEAR || JUN || align=right | 7.3 km || 
|-id=970 bgcolor=#d6d6d6
| 104970 ||  || — || May 7, 2000 || Socorro || LINEAR || — || align=right | 6.2 km || 
|-id=971 bgcolor=#d6d6d6
| 104971 ||  || — || May 7, 2000 || Socorro || LINEAR || — || align=right | 5.6 km || 
|-id=972 bgcolor=#E9E9E9
| 104972 ||  || — || May 10, 2000 || Socorro || LINEAR || — || align=right | 3.3 km || 
|-id=973 bgcolor=#fefefe
| 104973 ||  || — || May 4, 2000 || Anderson Mesa || LONEOS || — || align=right | 7.1 km || 
|-id=974 bgcolor=#E9E9E9
| 104974 ||  || — || May 4, 2000 || Anderson Mesa || LONEOS || — || align=right | 3.5 km || 
|-id=975 bgcolor=#d6d6d6
| 104975 ||  || — || May 5, 2000 || Socorro || LINEAR || — || align=right | 7.5 km || 
|-id=976 bgcolor=#d6d6d6
| 104976 ||  || — || May 5, 2000 || Socorro || LINEAR || — || align=right | 8.0 km || 
|-id=977 bgcolor=#d6d6d6
| 104977 ||  || — || May 5, 2000 || Socorro || LINEAR || ALA || align=right | 7.0 km || 
|-id=978 bgcolor=#d6d6d6
| 104978 ||  || — || May 6, 2000 || Socorro || LINEAR || EUP || align=right | 8.2 km || 
|-id=979 bgcolor=#d6d6d6
| 104979 ||  || — || May 1, 2000 || Anderson Mesa || LONEOS || — || align=right | 8.8 km || 
|-id=980 bgcolor=#E9E9E9
| 104980 ||  || — || May 1, 2000 || Anderson Mesa || LONEOS || — || align=right | 1.7 km || 
|-id=981 bgcolor=#d6d6d6
| 104981 ||  || — || May 1, 2000 || Anderson Mesa || LONEOS || THM || align=right | 7.1 km || 
|-id=982 bgcolor=#E9E9E9
| 104982 ||  || — || May 2, 2000 || Anderson Mesa || LONEOS || — || align=right | 4.3 km || 
|-id=983 bgcolor=#d6d6d6
| 104983 ||  || — || May 2, 2000 || Kitt Peak || Spacewatch || — || align=right | 4.6 km || 
|-id=984 bgcolor=#E9E9E9
| 104984 ||  || — || May 7, 2000 || Socorro || LINEAR || — || align=right | 2.1 km || 
|-id=985 bgcolor=#E9E9E9
| 104985 ||  || — || May 4, 2000 || Kitt Peak || Spacewatch || — || align=right | 4.7 km || 
|-id=986 bgcolor=#d6d6d6
| 104986 ||  || — || May 7, 2000 || Socorro || LINEAR || — || align=right | 6.7 km || 
|-id=987 bgcolor=#E9E9E9
| 104987 ||  || — || May 7, 2000 || Socorro || LINEAR || — || align=right | 2.5 km || 
|-id=988 bgcolor=#fefefe
| 104988 ||  || — || May 5, 2000 || Socorro || LINEAR || H || align=right data-sort-value="0.95" | 950 m || 
|-id=989 bgcolor=#d6d6d6
| 104989 ||  || — || May 5, 2000 || Socorro || LINEAR || — || align=right | 4.8 km || 
|-id=990 bgcolor=#E9E9E9
| 104990 ||  || — || May 13, 2000 || Kitt Peak || Spacewatch || — || align=right | 2.6 km || 
|-id=991 bgcolor=#d6d6d6
| 104991 ||  || — || May 12, 2000 || Haleakala || NEAT || — || align=right | 4.2 km || 
|-id=992 bgcolor=#E9E9E9
| 104992 ||  || — || May 5, 2000 || Socorro || LINEAR || — || align=right | 2.6 km || 
|-id=993 bgcolor=#E9E9E9
| 104993 ||  || — || May 2, 2000 || Kitt Peak || Spacewatch || — || align=right | 1.8 km || 
|-id=994 bgcolor=#d6d6d6
| 104994 ||  || — || May 2, 2000 || Anderson Mesa || LONEOS || TIR || align=right | 7.3 km || 
|-id=995 bgcolor=#fefefe
| 104995 || 2000 KJ || — || May 23, 2000 || Prescott || P. G. Comba || MAS || align=right | 1.7 km || 
|-id=996 bgcolor=#d6d6d6
| 104996 ||  || — || May 26, 2000 || Socorro || LINEAR || EUP || align=right | 8.7 km || 
|-id=997 bgcolor=#d6d6d6
| 104997 ||  || — || May 26, 2000 || Socorro || LINEAR || — || align=right | 10 km || 
|-id=998 bgcolor=#d6d6d6
| 104998 ||  || — || May 26, 2000 || Socorro || LINEAR || EUP || align=right | 6.3 km || 
|-id=999 bgcolor=#d6d6d6
| 104999 ||  || — || May 26, 2000 || Socorro || LINEAR || — || align=right | 6.1 km || 
|-id=000 bgcolor=#d6d6d6
| 105000 ||  || — || May 27, 2000 || Prescott || P. G. Comba || — || align=right | 6.4 km || 
|}

References

External links 
 Discovery Circumstances: Numbered Minor Planets (100001)–(105000) (IAU Minor Planet Center)

0104